= Acacia leprosa 'Scarlet Blaze' =

Variety of acacia

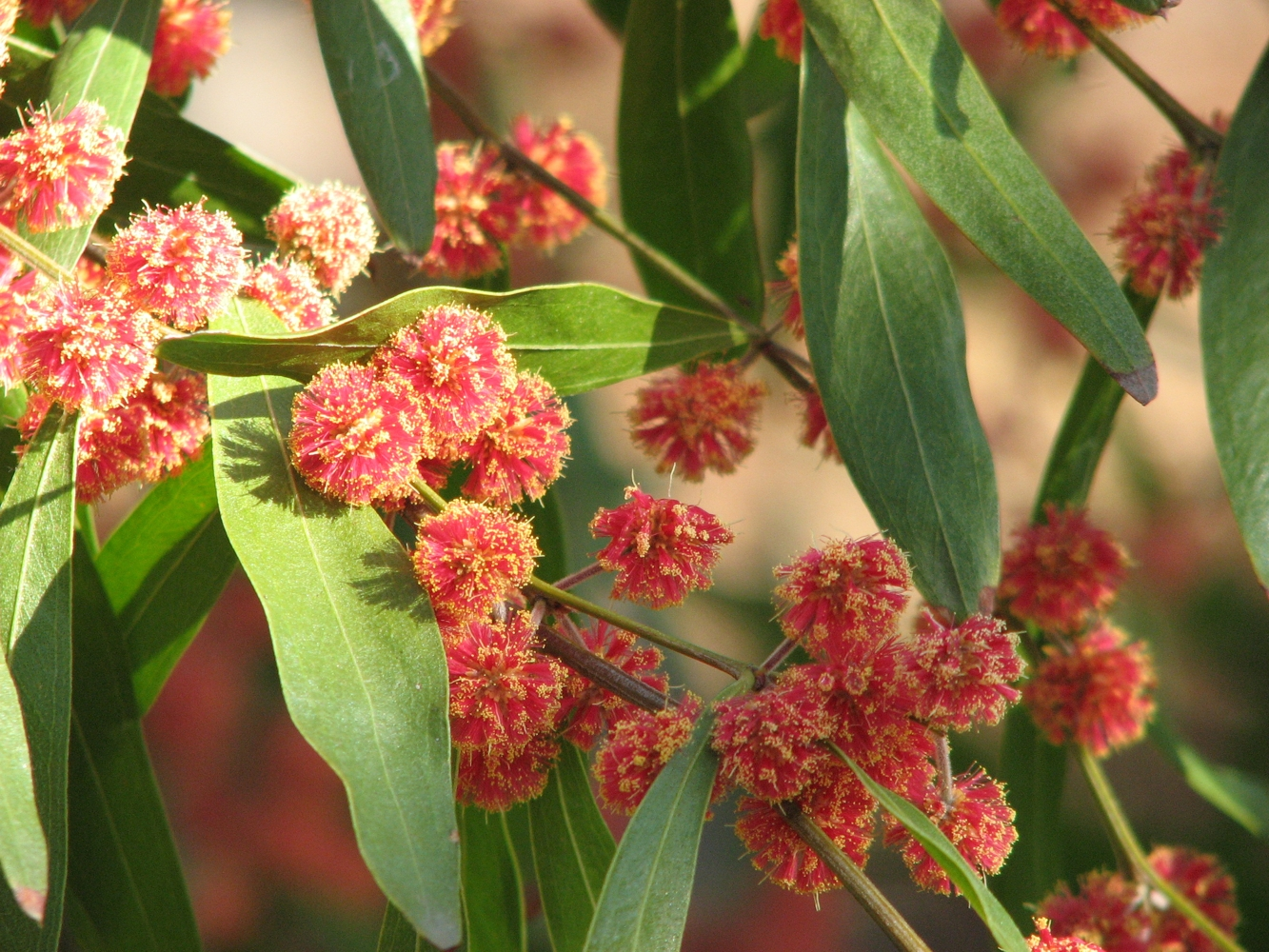
- Species: Acacia leprosa
- Cultivar: 'Scarlet Blaze'
- Origin: Black Range State Forest, Victoria, Australia

Acacia 'Scarlet Blaze' is a cultivar of Acacia leprosa (cinnamon wattle) originating from Victoria in Australia. It is noted for its unusual red flowers.

== Description ==
It is a small tree or large shrub, growing to 5 metres high and 3 metres wide. In common with all forms of Cinnamon Wattle, the leaves of the cultivar release a cinnamon-like scent from its foliage, particularly in hot weather. Red flowers appear in globular flower heads from late winter to early spring. The red flowers are rare in the genus Acacia sensu lato where flower colour usually ranges from cream to yellow to gold. There are other red-flowered species including Acacia pervillei and Acacia sakalava from Madagascar and Acacia reniformis from Mexico, however with the ongoing reorganisation of Acacia, most non-Australian species are in the process of being assigned to other genera.

== Discovery and introduction to cultivation ==
The original plant was first sighted in 1995 by a group of bushwalkers in the Black Range State Forest, north-east of Melbourne. It was a single red-flowering plant growing among the usual yellow flowered forms of the large phyllode variant of Acacia leprosa (Acacia leprosa var. uninervia) that was described as "8 feet tall and spreading".

The plant was propagated from cuttings by the Royal Botanic Gardens, Melbourne. Of these, three survived from which all currently grown plants are derived. In 1998 an application for plant breeders rights was made by Bill Molyneux on behalf of the Royal Botanic Gardens Melbourne which was granted in 2003. The sole original plant has since died.

The cultivar was released by Plant Growers Australia in Park Orchards in August 2001 in time for the plant to become Victoria's Centenary of Federation floral emblem.

== Cultivation ==
'Scarlet Blaze' prefers moist, well drained soils but has been found to be drought tolerant. Flowering and growth are promoted by a position in full sun, but some shade is tolerated. As with all cultivars, 'Scarlet Blaze' must be propagated by cuttings to produce true-to-type plants. Propagation from seeds has resulted in plants with flowers with a colour that ranges from yellow to red.
