= Acacia angustifolia =

Acacia angustifolia can refer to either of the following:

- Acacia angustifolia (Jacq.) H. L. Wendland—a synonym of Acacia suaveolens (Sm.) Willd.
- Acacia angustifolia Lodd.—a synonym of Acacia floribunda (Vent.) Willd.

== See also ==
- Senegalia angustifolia (Lam.) Britton & Rose
