= Senegalia gaumeri =

Conservation status
- Near Threatened (IUCN 2.3)

Scientific classification
- Kingdom: Plantae
- Clade: Tracheophytes
- Clade: Angiosperms
- Clade: Eudicots
- Clade: Rosids
- Order: Fabales
- Family: Fabaceae
- Subfamily: Caesalpinioideae
- Clade: Mimosoid clade
- Genus: Senegalia
- Species: S. gaumeri

Binomial name
- Senegalia gaumeri (Blake) Britton & Rose

Synonyms
- Acacia gaumeri Blake

Species of legume

Senegalia gaumeri is a species of plant in the family Fabaceae.

== Distribution ==
It is found only in Mexico.
