= Senegalia dudgeonii =

Conservation status
- Least Concern (IUCN 3.1)

Scientific classification
- Kingdom: Plantae
- Clade: Tracheophytes
- Clade: Angiosperms
- Clade: Eudicots
- Clade: Rosids
- Order: Fabales
- Family: Fabaceae
- Subfamily: Caesalpinioideae
- Clade: Mimosoid clade
- Genus: Senegalia
- Species: S. dudgeonii

Binomial name
- Senegalia dudgeonii (Craib ex Holland) Kyal. & Boatwr.

Synonyms
- Acacia dudgeonii Craib; Acacia samoryana A.Chev.

Species of plant

Senegalia dudgeonii is a small perennial tree that grows up to 9 meters tall. It belongs to the Fabaceae family and endemic Sudano-Sahelian and Guinea savannah zones of West Africa.

== Morphology ==
Bark is fissured, brown-reddish with stripes. Alternate, bipinnate leaves, 3-7 cm long, with 20-30 pairs of leaflets, 20 pairs of pinnae. White or cream flowers, 2.5-6 cm long and usually shorter than leaves.

== Distribution ==
Senegalia dudgeonii is endemic to the Sudanian and Guinea savannah regions of West Africa with a range spanning Senegal in the west to Central African Republic.

== Uses ==
Roots of the plant is used to treat snake bites while extracts from the bark is used to treat dysentery and diarrhea.
