= Senegalia manubensis =

Conservation status
- Vulnerable (IUCN 2.3)

Scientific classification
- Kingdom: Plantae
- Clade: Tracheophytes
- Clade: Angiosperms
- Clade: Eudicots
- Clade: Rosids
- Order: Fabales
- Family: Fabaceae
- Subfamily: Caesalpinioideae
- Clade: Mimosoid clade
- Genus: Senegalia
- Species: S. manubensis

Binomial name
- Senegalia manubensis (J. H. Ross) Kyal. & Boatwr.

Synonyms
- Acacia manubensis J. H. Ross

Species of legume

Senegalia manubensis is a species of plant in the family Fabaceae. It is found only in Somalia, and is threatened by habitat loss. Its appearance consists of a small tree with a rounded crown, growing to a maximum of 5 metres tall.

== Uses ==
The plant is gathered from the wild as it contains a gum which can be sold at local markets.
