= Senegalia schlechteri =

Conservation status
- Data Deficient (IUCN 2.3)

Scientific classification
- Kingdom: Plantae
- Clade: Tracheophytes
- Clade: Angiosperms
- Clade: Eudicots
- Clade: Rosids
- Order: Fabales
- Family: Fabaceae
- Subfamily: Caesalpinioideae
- Clade: Mimosoid clade
- Genus: Senegalia
- Species: S. schlechteri

Binomial name
- Senegalia schlechteri (Harms) Kyal. & Boatwr.

Synonyms
- Acacia schlechteri Harms

Species of legume

Senegalia schlechteri is a species of plant in the family Fabaceae. It is found only in Mozambique.
