= Senegalia megaladena =

Scientific classification
- Kingdom: Plantae
- Clade: Embryophytes
- Clade: Tracheophytes
- Clade: Spermatophytes
- Clade: Angiosperms
- Clade: Eudicots
- Clade: Rosids
- Order: Fabales
- Family: Fabaceae
- Subfamily: Caesalpinioideae
- Clade: Mimosoid clade
- Genus: Senegalia
- Species: S. megaladena

Binomial name
- Senegalia megaladena (Desv.) Maslin, Seigler & Ebinger

Synonyms
- Acacia megaladena Desv.; see below for synonyms of varieties

Species of plant

Senegalia megaladena

Scientific classification
- Kingdom: Plantae
- Clade: Embryophytes
- Clade: Tracheophytes
- Clade: Spermatophytes
- Clade: Angiosperms
- Clade: Eudicots
- Clade: Rosids
- Order: Fabales
- Family: Fabaceae
- Subfamily: Caesalpinioideae
- Clade: Mimosoid clade
- Genus: Senegalia
- Species: S. megaladena
- Variety: S. m. var. indochinensis

Trinomial name
- Senegalia megaladena var. indochinensis (I.C.Nielsen) Maslin, Seigler & Ebinger

Synonyms
- Acacia megaladena var. indochinensis I.C.Nielsen

Senegalia megaladena

Scientific classification
- Kingdom: Plantae
- Clade: Embryophytes
- Clade: Tracheophytes
- Clade: Spermatophytes
- Clade: Angiosperms
- Clade: Eudicots
- Clade: Rosids
- Order: Fabales
- Family: Fabaceae
- Subfamily: Caesalpinioideae
- Clade: Mimosoid clade
- Genus: Senegalia
- Species: S. megaladena
- Variety: S. m. var. megaladena

Trinomial name
- Senegalia megaladena var. megaladena

Synonyms
- Acacia arrophula D.Don; Acacia brunnescens C.E.Parkinson; Acacia paludosa Blume ex Miq.; Acacia tenerrima (de Vriese) Miq.; Albizia tenerrima de Vriese

Senegalia megaladena is a spiny climber, shrub or tree, native to Jawa, and from mainland Southeast Asia to China and India. It is eaten as a vegetable and used as a fish poison. It is named after its distinctive large gland on the petioles.

== Description ==
The species grows as a robust climber (stems can measure up to 50mm d.b.h.) or as a straggly shrub or tree (from 4 to 10m tall), and is perennial. The leaves are bipinnate. Distinguishing features for the species are: rather prominently raised petiole gland whose position is variable, commonly near middle of petiole, 1-5-5mm in length, with a length to width ration of 0.7 to 2.5, and orange to orange-brown in colour when fresh.

The autonym megaladena variety is distinguished by having 4 to 8mm long leaflets, usually 0.8 to 1.5mm in width, with visible lateral veins (though sometimes obscure, sometimes quite evident). It flowers in Yunnan from July to September, fruits from December (rarely) to February.

The indochinensis variety has smaller leaflets, ranging from 2mm, usually 3 to 4mm, and up to 5mm long, some 0.4 to 0.6mm wide, with the lateral veins usually not visible or sometimes extremely faint. Flowering occurs in Hainan from July to September, while mature fruit have been collected in April.

== Distribution ==
The species is found in Jawa and from Mainland Southeast Asia to Zhōngguó/China and India. Countries and regions where the plant grows as a native include: Indonesia (Jawa); Malaysia (Peninsular Malaysia); Thailand; Cambodia; Vietnam; Zhōngguó/China (Hainan, Yunnan); Laos; Myanmar; India (including Andaman Islands, Assam); Bangladesh; East Himalaya; and Nepal.

The variety indochinensis grows as a native in an area from Peninsular Malaysia to Vietnam and Hainan in Zhōngguó/China. Countries and regions that it occurs in as a native are: Malaysia (Peninsular Malaysia); Thailand; Cambodia; Laos; Vietnam; and Zhōngguó/China (Hainan). It has been introduced to Jawa in Indonesia.

== Habitat and ecology ==
Growing as a climber or as a spiny shrub in Southeast Asia, The indochinensis variety occurs in secondary forests, in clearings or alongside roads. It grows in open forests in Zhōngguó/China at between 100 and 400m altitude.

In Zhōngguó/China the megaladena variety grows in forests that range from open to dense, or in thickets. It is associated with sandstone mountains, and is recorded from 230 to 1400m in altitude. Maslin et al. comment that "[i]n Jinping County where we observed living plants they were quite common in the general area but occurred singularly or in groups of a few individuals."

== Vernacular names ==
In Cambodia the species is known as sâ-âm (Khmer language). The plant is known as klae kwo amongst Karen people of Chiang Mai Province, northern Thailand. In China the species is referred to as 钝叶金合欢, dùn yè jīn hé huān. Another name that has been used is the English language obtuse-leaflet senegalia.

== Uses ==
In Cambodia the leaves are eaten raw or cooked as a vegetable, while the roots and bark are used to poison fish. The plant is used to a moderate extent by Karen people in Chiang Mai Province, Thailand. The bark and roots provide an insecticide smoke, and are pounded to be used as a fish poison. The leaves are cooked as a vegetable. The leaves and stem are also used to treat itching, either pounded and applied as a liniment or burnt so as to smoke.

== History ==
The species was described in 2013 by the team of Bruce Maslin (born 1946), David Stanley Seigler (born 1940), and John Edwin Ebinger (born 1933). Maslin is an Australian botanist specialising in Acacia sensu lato. They published their article New combinations in Senegalia and Vachellia (Leguminosae: Mimosoideae) for Southeast Asia and China in the journal Blumea. The indochinensis variety was described in the same publication.

The French botanist, Nicaise Auguste Desvaux (1784-1856) described the taxa Acacia megaladena in 1814 in the Journal de Botanique, Appliquée à l'Agriculture, à la Pharmacie, à la Médecine et aux Arts (Paris). That remained the species name until Acacia was demonstrated to be polyphyletic and the genus Senegalia was accepted.

According to Maslin et al. the species epithet comes from the ancient Greek megalos (large) and adenos (gland), alluding to the relatively large petiole gland. The proper word for "gland" is adḗn (ἀδήν) in ancient Greek.
