= Senegalia etilis =

Conservation status
- Vulnerable (IUCN 2.3)

Scientific classification
- Kingdom: Plantae
- Clade: Embryophytes
- Clade: Tracheophytes
- Clade: Angiosperms
- Clade: Eudicots
- Clade: Rosids
- Order: Fabales
- Family: Fabaceae
- Subfamily: Caesalpinioideae
- Clade: Mimosoid clade
- Genus: Senegalia
- Species: S. etilis

Binomial name
- Senegalia etilis (Speg.) Seigler & Ebinger

Synonyms
- Acacia etilis Speg.

Species of legume

Senegalia etilis is a species of plant in the family Fabaceae. It is found in Argentina and Bolivia. It is threatened by habitat loss.

It reaches a size of 4-5 m in height. The flowers are white and sessile.
