= Senegalia pseudonigrescens =

Conservation status
- Critically Endangered (IUCN 3.1)

Scientific classification
- Kingdom: Plantae
- Clade: Tracheophytes
- Clade: Angiosperms
- Clade: Eudicots
- Clade: Rosids
- Order: Fabales
- Family: Fabaceae
- Subfamily: Caesalpinioideae
- Clade: Mimosoid clade
- Genus: Senegalia
- Species: S. pseudonigrescens

Binomial name
- Senegalia pseudonigrescens (Brenan & J.H.Ross) Kyal. & Boatwr.

Synonyms
- Acacia pseudonigrescens Brenan & J. Ross

Species of legume

Senegalia pseudonigrescens is a species of plant in the family Fabaceae. It is found only in Ethiopia. It is threatened by habitat loss.
