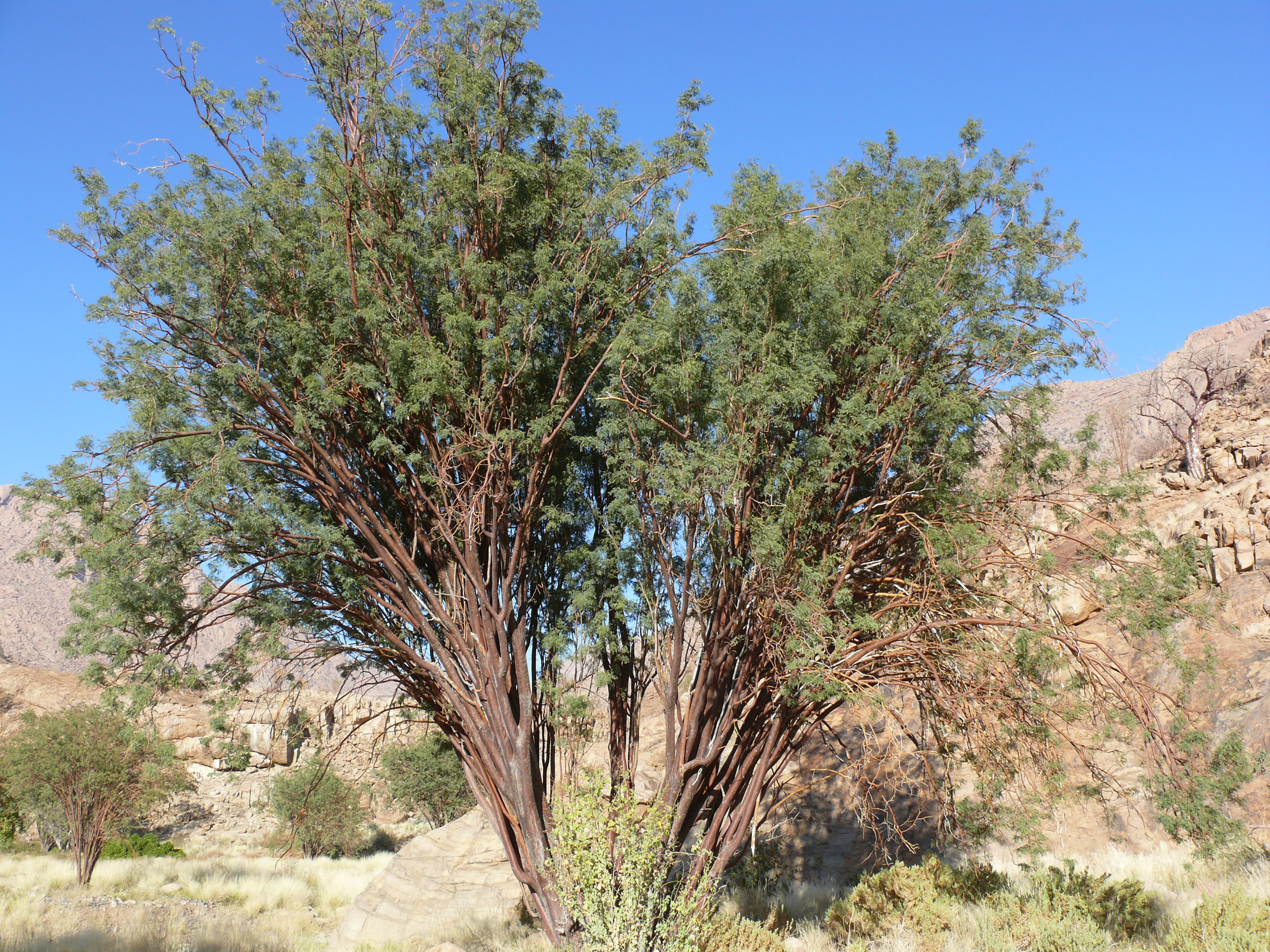

Conservation status
- Near Threatened (IUCN 2.3)

Scientific classification
- Kingdom: Plantae
- Clade: Tracheophytes
- Clade: Angiosperms
- Clade: Eudicots
- Clade: Rosids
- Order: Fabales
- Family: Fabaceae
- Subfamily: Caesalpinioideae
- Clade: Mimosoid clade
- Genus: Senegalia
- Species: S. montis-usti

Binomial name
- Senegalia montis-usti (Merxm. & A. Schreib.) Kyal. & Boatwr.

Synonyms
- Acacia montis-usti Merxm. & A. Schreib.

= Senegalia montis-usti =

Species of plant

Senegalia montis-usti, the Brandberg acacia, is a species of plant in the family Fabaceae. It is found only in Namibia.
