= Senegalia grandisiliqua =

Scientific classification
- Kingdom: Plantae
- Clade: Tracheophytes
- Clade: Angiosperms
- Clade: Eudicots
- Clade: Rosids
- Order: Fabales
- Family: Fabaceae
- Subfamily: Caesalpinioideae
- Clade: Mimosoid clade
- Genus: Senegalia
- Species: S. grandisiliqua

Binomial name
- Senegalia grandisiliqua (Benth.) Seigler & Ebinger

Synonyms
- Acacia grandisiliqua Benth.

Species of legume

Senegalia grandisiliqua is a species of plant in the family Fabaceae.
