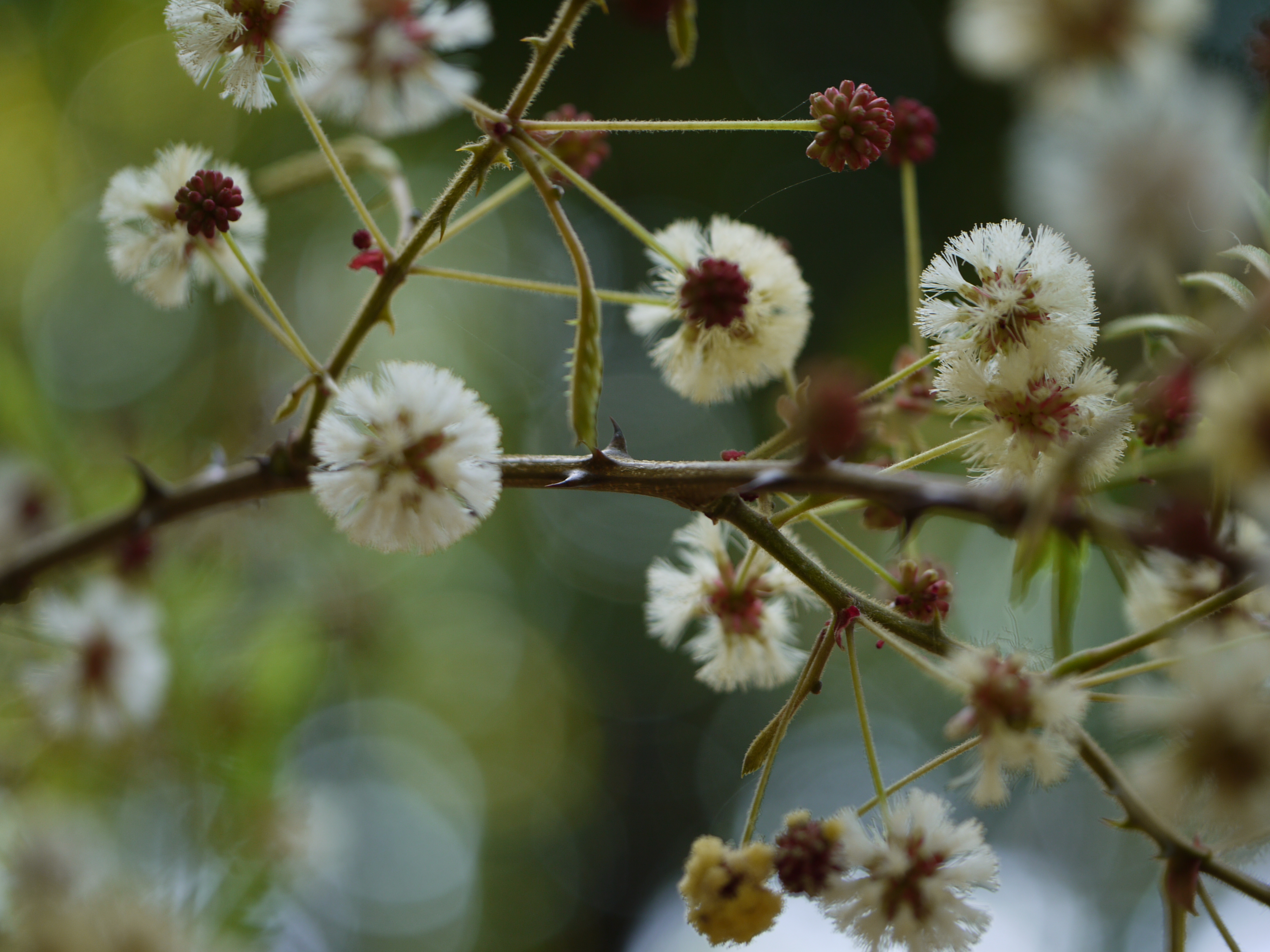

Scientific classification
- Kingdom: Plantae
- Clade: Tracheophytes
- Clade: Angiosperms
- Clade: Eudicots
- Clade: Rosids
- Order: Fabales
- Family: Fabaceae
- Subfamily: Caesalpinioideae
- Clade: Mimosoid clade
- Genus: Senegalia
- Species: S. torta

Binomial name
- Senegalia torta (Roxb.) Maslin, Seigler & Ebinger

Synonyms
- Acacia torta (Roxb.) Craib; Mimosa torta Roxb.

= Senegalia torta =

Species of legume

Senegalia torta is a scrambling shrub and grows primarily in the seasonally dry tropical biome. It is distributed in the Indian subcontinent.
