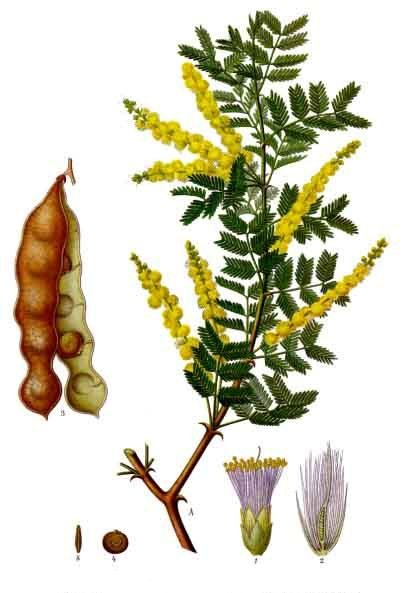
- Senegalia senegal

Scientific classification
- Kingdom: Plantae
- Clade: Embryophytes
- Clade: Tracheophytes
- Clade: Spermatophytes
- Clade: Angiosperms
- Clade: Eudicots
- Clade: Rosids
- Order: Fabales
- Family: Fabaceae
- Subfamily: Caesalpinioideae
- Clade: Mimosoid clade
- Genus: Senegalia; Raf. 1838

Type species
- Senegalia senegal (L.) Britton & P. Wilson

Sections and species-groups
- Section Senegalia; Section Monacanthea; Caesia species-group; Hainanensis species-group; Rugata species-group; Pennata species-group; Teniana species-group
- The range of the genus Senegalia

Synonyms
- Acacia subgen. Aculeiferum Vassal sect. Aculeiferum Pedley; Austroacacia Mill.; Dugandia Britton & Killip 1936; Manganaroa Speg. 1921

= Senegalia =

Genus of plants in the legume family

Senegalia (from Senegal and Acacia senegal (L.) Willd.) is a genus of flowering plants in the family Fabaceae. It belongs to the Mimosoid clade. Until 2005, its species were considered members of Acacia. The genus was considered polyphyletic and required further division, with the genera Parasenegalia and Pseudosenegalia accepted soon after.

Senegalia can be distinguished from other acacias by its spicate inflorescences and non-spinescent stipules. Plants in the genus are native to the tropical and subtropical areas of the world, occurring on the Australian, Asian, African and South and North American continents, as well as in Wallacea.

== Species list ==
Senegalia comprises the following 222 species, as of February 2021:

- Senegalia adenocalyx (Brenan & Exell) Kyal. & Boatwr.
- Senegalia afra (Thunb.) P.J.H.Hurter & Mabb.
- Senegalia albizioides (Pedley) Pedley – climbing wattle
- Senegalia alemquerensis (Huber) Seigler & Ebinger
- Senegalia alexae Seigler & Ebinger
- Senegalia altiscandens (Ducke) Seigler & Ebinger
- Senegalia amazonica (Benth.) Seigler & Ebinger
- Senegalia andamanica (I.C.Nielsen) Maslin, Seigler & Ebinger
- Senegalia angustifolia (Lam.) Britton & Rose
- Senegalia anisophylla (S.Watson) Britton & Rose
- Senegalia ankokib (Chiov.) Kyal. & Boatwr.
- Senegalia aristeguietana (L.Cárdenas) Seigler & Ebinger
- Senegalia asak (Forssk.) Kyal. & Boatwr.
- Senegalia ataxacantha (DC.) Kyal. & Boatwr. – flame acacia
- Senegalia atlantica V.Terra & F.C.P.Garcia
- Senegalia bahiensis (Benth.) Bocage & L.P.Queiroz
- Senegalia baronii (Villiers & Du Puy) Boatwr.
- Senegalia berlandieri (Benth.) Britton & Rose
- Senegalia bonariensis (Gillies ex Hook. & Arn.) Seigler & Ebinger
- Senegalia borneensis (I.C.Nielsen) Maslin, Seigler & Ebinger – cat's claw acacia
- Senegalia brevispica (Harms) Seigler & Ebinger
- Senegalia burkei (Benth.) Kyal. & Boatwr. – Black monkey thorn
- Senegalia caesia (L.) Maslin, Seigler & Ebinger
- Senegalia caraniana (Chiov.) Kyal. & Boatwr.
- Senegalia catechu (L.f.) P.J.H.Hurter & Mabb. – Cutch tree
- Senegalia catharinensis (Burkart) Seigler & Ebinger
- Senegalia cearensis V.Terra & F.C.P.Garcia
- Senegalia chariessa (Milne-Redh.) Kyal. & Boatwr.
- Senegalia cheilanthifolia (Chiov.) Kyal. & Boatwr.
- Senegalia chundra (Roxb. ex Rottler) Maslin
- Senegalia circummarginata (Chiov.) Kyal. & Boatwr.
- Senegalia clandestina Maslin, B.C.Ho, H.Sun & L.Bai
- Senegalia comosa (Gagnep.) Maslin, Seigler & Ebinger
- Senegalia condyloclada (Chiov.) Kyal. & Boatwr.
- Senegalia crassifolia (A.Gray) Britton & Rose – Anacacho orchid tree
- Senegalia croatii Seigler & Ebinger
- Senegalia cupuliformis V.Terra & F.C.P.Garcia
- Senegalia delavayi (Franch.) Maslin, Seigler & Ebinger
- Senegalia densispina (Thulin) Kyal. & Boatwr.
- Senegalia diadenia (R.Parker) Ragup., Seigler, Ebinger & Maslin
- Senegalia donaldi (Haines) Ragup., Seigler, Ebinger & Maslin
- Senegalia donnaiensis (Gagnep.) Maslin, Seigler & Ebinger
- Senegalia duartei Seigler & Ebinger
- Senegalia dudgeonii (Craib) Kyal. & Boatwr.
- Senegalia ebingeri Seigler
- Senegalia emilioana (Fortunato & Ciald.) Seigler & Ebinger
- Senegalia × emoryana (Benth.) Britton & Rose
- Senegalia eriocarpa Kyal. & Boatwr. – Woolly-podded acacia
- Senegalia erubescens (Welw. ex Oliv.) Kyal. & Boatwr.
- Senegalia erythrocalyx (Brenan) Kyal. & Boatwr.
- Senegalia etilis (Speg.) Seigler & Ebinger
- Senegalia ferruginea (DC.) Pedley
- Senegalia fiebrigii (Hassl.) Seigler & Ebinger
- Senegalia flagellaris (Thulin) Kyal. & Boatwr.
- Senegalia fleckii (Schinz) Boatwr.
- Senegalia fumosa (Thulin) Kyal. & Boatwr.
- Senegalia gageana (Craib) Maslin, Seigler & Ebinger
- Senegalia galpinii (Burtt Davy) Seigler & Ebinger
- Senegalia garrettii (I.C.Nielsen) Maslin, B.C.Ho, H.Sun & L.Bai
- Senegalia gaumeri (S.F.Blake) Britton & Rose
- Senegalia giganticarpa (G.P.Lewis) Seigler & Ebinger
- Senegalia gilliesii (Steud.) Seigler & Ebinger
- Senegalia globosa (Bocage & Miotto) L.P.Queiroz
- Senegalia goetzei (Harms) Kyal. & Boatwr.
- Senegalia gourmaensis (A.Chev.) Kyal. & Boatwr.
- Senegalia grandistipula (Benth.) Seigler & Ebinger
- Senegalia greggii (A.Gray) Britton & Rose – catclaw, cat's-claw, catclaw acacia, garra del diablo, Gregg catclaw, long-flower catclaw, paradise flower, Texas catclaw, Texas mimosa, wait-a-bit
- Senegalia guangdongensis Maslin, B.C.Ho, H.Sun & L.Bai
- Senegalia guarensis (L.Cárdenas & F.García) Seigler & Ebinger
- Senegalia hainanensis (Hayata) H.Sun
- Senegalia hamulosa (Benth.) Boatwr.
- Senegalia harleyi Seigler, Ebinger & P.G.Ribeiro
- Senegalia hatschbachii Seigler, Ebinger & P.G.Ribeiro
- Senegalia hayesii (Benth.) Britton & Rose
- Senegalia hecatophylla (Steud. ex A.Rich.) Kyal. & Boatwr.
- Senegalia hereroensis (Engl.) Kyal. & Boatwr. – Mountain thorn
- Senegalia hildebrandtii (Vatke) Boatwr.
- Senegalia hoehnei Seigler, M.P.Lima, M.J.F.Barros & Ebinger
- Senegalia hohenackeri (Craib) Ragup., Seigler, Ebinger & Maslin
- Senegalia huberi (Ducke) Seigler & Ebinger
- Senegalia insuavis (Lace) Pedley
- Senegalia interior Britton & Rose – Interior acacia
- Senegalia intsia (L.) Maslin, Seigler & Ebinger
- Senegalia irwinii Seigler, Ebinger & P.G.Ribeiro
- Senegalia kallunkiae (J.W.Grimes & Barneby) Bocage & L.P.Queiroz
- Senegalia kamerunensis (Gand.) Kyal. & Boatwr.
- Senegalia kekapur (I.C.Nielsen) Maslin, Seigler & Ebinger
- Senegalia kelloggiana (A.M.Carter & Rudd) C.E.Glass & Seigler
- Senegalia kerrii (I.C.Nielsen) Maslin, B.C.Ho, H.Sun & L.Bai
- Senegalia klugii (Standl. ex J.F.Macbr.) Seigler & Ebinger
- Senegalia kostermansii (I.C.Nielsen) Maslin, Seigler & Ebinger
- Senegalia kraussiana (Meisn. ex Benth.) Kyal. & Boatwr.
- Senegalia kuhlmannii (Ducke) Seigler & Ebinger
- Senegalia kunmingensis (C.Chen & H.Sun) Maslin, B.C.Ho, H.Sun & L.Bai
- Senegalia lacerans (Benth.) Seigler & Ebinger
- Senegalia laeta (R.Br. ex Benth.) Seigler & Ebinger
- Senegalia langsdorffii (Benth.) Bocage & L.P.Queiroz
- Senegalia lankaensis (Kosterm.) Ragup., Seigler, Ebinger & Maslin
- Senegalia lasiophylla (Benth.) Seigler & Ebinger
- Senegalia latifoliola (Kuntze) Seigler & Ebinger
- Senegalia latistipulata (Harms) Kyal. & Boatwr.
- Senegalia lenticularis (Buch.-Ham. ex Benth.) Ragup., Seigler, Ebinger & Maslin
- Senegalia lewisii (Bocage & Miotto) L.P.Queiroz
- Senegalia limae (Bocage & Miotto) L.P.Queiroz
- Senegalia loetteri N.Hahn
- Senegalia loretensis (J.F.Macbr.) Seigler & Ebinger
- Senegalia lowei (L.Rico) Seigler & Ebinger
- Senegalia lozanoi Britton & Rose
- Senegalia lujae (De Wild. & T.Durand) Kyal. & Boatwr.
- Senegalia macbridei (Britton & Rose ex J.F.Macbr.) Seigler & Ebinger
- Senegalia macilenta (Rose) Britton & Rose – Thin acacia
- Senegalia macrocephala (Lace) Maslin, B.C.Ho, H.Sun & L.Bai
- Senegalia macrostachya (Rchb. ex DC.) Kyal. & Boatwr.
- Senegalia magnibracteosa (Burkart) Seigler & Ebinger
- Senegalia mahrana (Thulin & Al-Gifri) Ragup., Seigler, Ebinger & Maslin
- Senegalia manubensis (J.H.Ross) Kyal. & Boatwr.
- Senegalia martii (Benth.) Seigler & Ebinger
- Senegalia martiusiana (Steud.) Bocage & L.P.Queiroz
- Senegalia maschalocephala (Griseb.) Britton & Rose
- Senegalia mattogrossensis (Malme) Seigler & Ebinger
- Senegalia meeboldii (Craib) Maslin, Seigler & Ebinger
- Senegalia megaladena (Desv.) Maslin, Seigler & Ebinger
- Senegalia mellifera (Benth.) Seigler & Ebinger
- Senegalia menabeensis (Villiers & Du Puy) Boatwr.
- Senegalia meridionalis (Villiers & Du Puy) Boatwr.
- Senegalia merrillii (I.C.Nielsen) Maslin, Seigler & Ebinger – Merrill's wattle
- Senegalia micrantha Britton & Rose
- Senegalia mikanii (Benth.) Seigler & Ebinger
- Senegalia mirandae (L.Rico) Seigler & Ebinger
- Senegalia modesta (Wall.) P.J.H.Hurter
- Senegalia moggii (Thulin & Tardelli) Kyal. & Boatwr.
- Senegalia monacantha (Willd.) Bocage & L.P.Queiroz
- Senegalia montigena (Brenan & Exell) Kyal. & Boatwr.
- Senegalia montis-salinarum N.Hahn
- Senegalia montis-usti (Merxm. & A.Schreib.) Kyal. & Boatwr. – Brandberg acacia
- Senegalia nigrescens (Oliv.) P.J.H.Hurter
- Senegalia nitidifolia (Speg.) Seigler & Ebinger
- Senegalia noblickii Seigler & Ebinger
- Senegalia obliqua Maslin, B.C.Ho, H.Sun & L.Bai
- Senegalia occidentalis (Rose) Britton & Rose – Western acacia, Tree catclaw
- Senegalia ochracea (Thulin & A.S.Hassan) Kyal. & Boatwr.
- Senegalia ogadensis (Chiov.) Kyal. & Boatwr.
- Senegalia olivensana (G.P.Lewis) Seigler & Ebinger
- Senegalia orientalis Maslin, B.C.Ho, H.Sun & L.Bai
- Senegalia paganuccii Seigler, Ebinger & P.G.Ribeiro
- Senegalia painteri Britton & Rose
- Senegalia palawanensis (I.C.Nielsen) Maslin, Seigler & Ebinger
- Senegalia paniculata (Willd.) Killip
- Senegalia paraensis (Ducke) Seigler & Ebinger
- Senegalia parviceps (Speg.) Seigler & Ebinger
- Senegalia pedicellata (Benth.) Seigler & Ebinger
- Senegalia peninsularis Britton & Rose – Peninsular acacia
- Senegalia pennata (L.) Maslin – Climbing wattle
- Senegalia pentagona (Schumach.) Kyal. & Boatwr.
- Senegalia persiciflora (Pax) Kyal. & Boatwr.
- Senegalia pervillei (Benth.) Boatwr.
- Senegalia petrensis (Thulin) Kyal. & Boatwr.
- Senegalia phillippei Seigler & Ebinger
- Senegalia piauhiensis (Benth.) Bocage & L.P.Queiroz
- Senegalia picachensis (Brandegee) Britton & Rose – Mount Picachos acacia
- Senegalia piptadenioides (G.P.Lewis) Seigler & Ebinger
- Senegalia pluricapitata (Steud.) Maslin, Seigler & Ebinger
- Senegalia pluriglandulosa (Verdc.) Maslin, Seigler & Ebinger
- Senegalia polhillii (Villiers & Du Puy) Boatwr.
- Senegalia polyacantha (Willd.) Seigler & Ebinger – Catechu tree
- Senegalia polyphylla (DC.) Britton & Rose – Manyleaf acacia
- Senegalia praecox (Griseb.) Seigler & Ebinger
- Senegalia prominens Maslin, B.C.Ho, H.Sun & L.Bai
- Senegalia pruinescens (Kurz) Maslin, Seigler & Ebinger
- Senegalia pseudointsia (Miq.) Maslin, Seigler & Ebinger
- Senegalia pseudonigrescens (Brenan & J.H.Ross) Kyal. & Boatwr.
- Senegalia pteridifolia (Benth.) Seigler & Ebinger
- Senegalia purpusii (Brandegee) Britton & Rose
- Senegalia quadriglandulosa (Mart.) Seigler & Ebinger
- Senegalia rafinesqueana V.Terra & F.C.P.Garcia
- Senegalia recurva (Benth.) Seigler & Ebinger
- Senegalia reniformis (Benth.) Britton & Rose
- Senegalia rhytidocarpa (L.Rico) Seigler & Ebinger
- Senegalia ricoae (Bocage & Miotto) L.P.Queiroz
- Senegalia riparia (Kunth) Britton & Rose – Catch and keep, Riparian acacia
- Senegalia robynsiana (Merxm. & A.Schreib.) Kyal. & Boatwr.
- Senegalia roemeriana (Scheele) Britton & Rose – Catclaw, Roemer acacia, Roemer catclaw, Round-flower catclaw
- Senegalia rostrata (Humb. & Bonpl. ex Willd.) Seigler & Ebinger
- Senegalia rovumae (Oliv.) Kyal. & Boatwr.
- Senegalia rugata (Lam.) Britton & Rose
- Senegalia sakalava (Drake) Boatwr.
- Senegalia saltilloensis Britton & Rose
- Senegalia schlechteri (Harms) Kyal. & Boatwr.
- Senegalia schweinfurthii (Brenan & Exell) Seigler & Ebinger
- Senegalia seigleri Ebinger
- Senegalia senegal (L.) Britton
- Senegalia serra (Benth.) Seigler & Ebinger
- Senegalia somalensis (Vatke) Kyal. & Boatwr.
- Senegalia sororia (Standl.) Britton & Rose
- Senegalia stenocarpa Seigler & Ebinger
- Senegalia stipitata Maslin, B.C.Ho, H.Sun & L.Bai
- Senegalia subangulata (Rose) Britton & Rose
- Senegalia subsessilis Britton & Rose
- Senegalia sulitii (I.C.Nielsen) Maslin, Seigler & Ebinger
- Senegalia tamarindifolia (L.) Britton & Rose – Tamarind-leaf acacia
- Senegalia tanganyikensis (Brenan) Kyal. & Boatwr.
- Senegalia tanjorensis (Ragup., Thoth. & A.Mahad.) A.Deshp. & Maslin
- Senegalia tawitawiensis (I.C.Nielsen) Maslin, Seigler & Ebinger
- Senegalia taylorii (Brenan & Exell) Kyal. & Boatwr.
- Senegalia teniana (Harms) Maslin, Seigler & Ebinger
- Senegalia tenuifolia (L.) Britton & Rose
- Senegalia tephrodermis (Brenan) Kyal. & Boatwr.
- Senegalia thailandica (I.C.Nielsen) Maslin, Seigler & Ebinger
- Senegalia thomasii (Harms) Kyal. & Boatwr.
- Senegalia tonkinensis (I.C.Nielsen) Maslin, Seigler & Ebinger
- Senegalia torta (Roxb.) Maslin, Seigler & Ebinger
- Senegalia trijuga (Rizzini) Seigler & Ebinger
- Senegalia tucumanensis (Griseb.) Seigler & Ebinger
- Senegalia × turneri Seigler, Ebinger & C.E.Glass
- Senegalia velutina (DC.) Bocage & L.P.Queiroz
- Senegalia venosa (Hochst. ex Benth.) Kyal. & Boatwr.
- Senegalia verheijenii (I.C.Nielsen) Maslin, Seigler & Ebinger
- Senegalia vietnamensis (I.C.Nielsen) Maslin, Seigler & Ebinger
- Senegalia weberbaueri (Harms) Seigler & Ebinger
- Senegalia welwitschii (Oliv.) Kyal. & Boatwr.
- Senegalia westiana (DC.) Britton & Rose
- Senegalia wrightii (Benth.) Britton & Rose – catclaw, long-flower catclaw, Texas catclaw, Wright acacia, Wright's acacia, Wright catclaw, Wright catclaw acacia
- Senegalia yunnanensis (Franch.) Maslin, Seigler & Ebinger
- Senegalia × zamudioi Seigler, Ebinger & C.E.Glass
- Senegalia zizyphispina (Chiov.) Kyal. & Boatwr.

== Reassigned taxa ==
- Senegalia grandisiliqua (Vell.) Seigler & Ebinger, synonym of Senegalia tenuifolia var. tenuifolia

== See also ==
- Acacia
- Acaciella
- Mariosousa
- Parasenegalia
- Pseudosenegalia
- Vachellia
