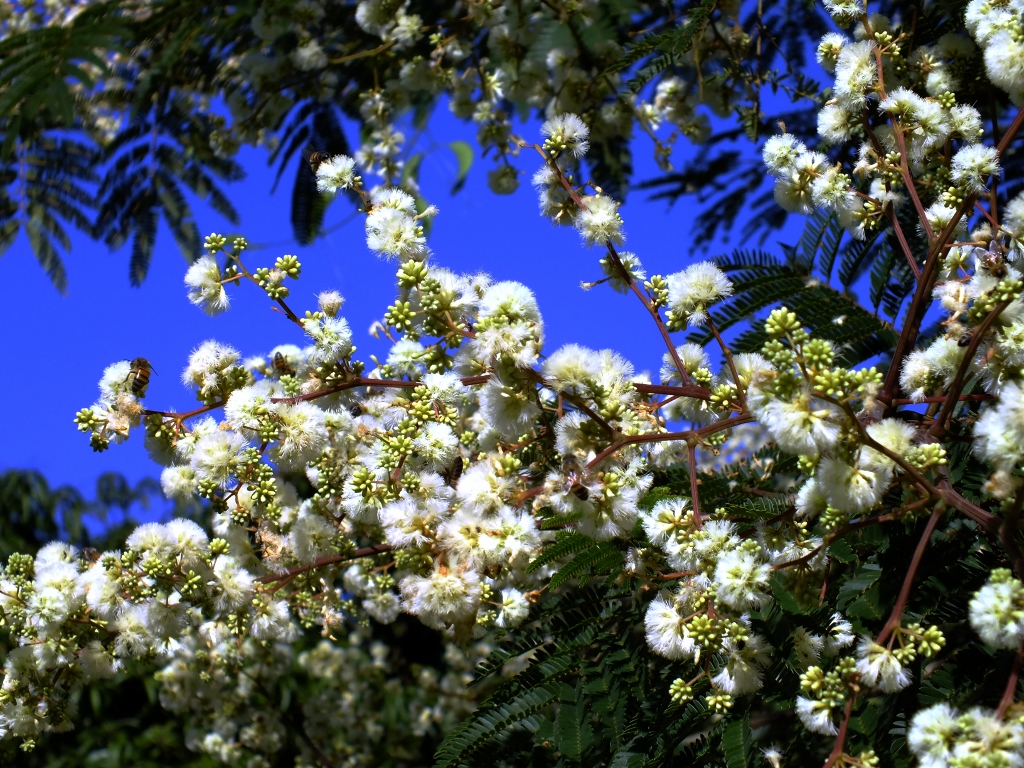

Scientific classification
- Kingdom: Plantae
- Clade: Tracheophytes
- Clade: Angiosperms
- Clade: Eudicots
- Clade: Rosids
- Order: Fabales
- Family: Fabaceae
- Subfamily: Caesalpinioideae
- Clade: Mimosoid clade
- Genus: Senegalia
- Species: S. lowei

Binomial name
- Senegalia lowei (L.Rico) Seigler & Ebinger

Synonyms
- Acacia fluminense (Vell.) Angely; Acacia lowei L.Rico; Acacia plumosa Lowe; Acacia scandens Benth.; Mimosa fluminensis Vell.

= Senegalia lowei =

Species of plant in the legume family

Senegalia lowei, also commonly known as feathery acacia, is a plant native to Brazil, which is also called unha de gato, Portuguese for "cat's claw".
