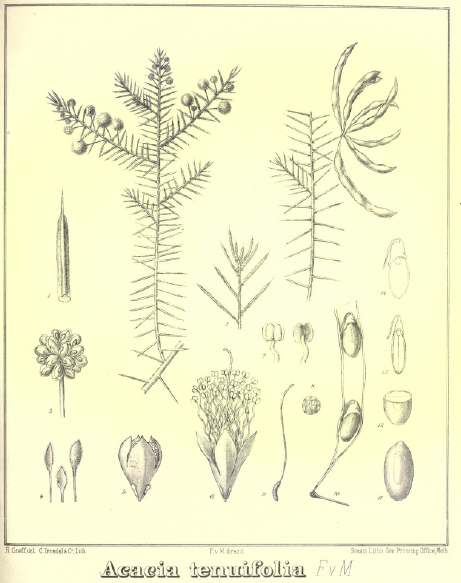

Scientific classification
- Kingdom: Plantae
- Clade: Tracheophytes
- Clade: Angiosperms
- Clade: Eudicots
- Clade: Rosids
- Order: Fabales
- Family: Fabaceae
- Subfamily: Caesalpinioideae
- Clade: Mimosoid clade
- Genus: Senegalia
- Species: S. tenuifolia

Binomial name
- Senegalia tenuifolia (L.) Britton & Rose

Varieties
- Senegalia tenuifolia var. producta (Grimes) Seigler & Ebinger; Senegalia tenuifolia var. tenuifolia (L.) Britton & Rose; Senegalia tenuifolia var. veraensis (Kitan.)
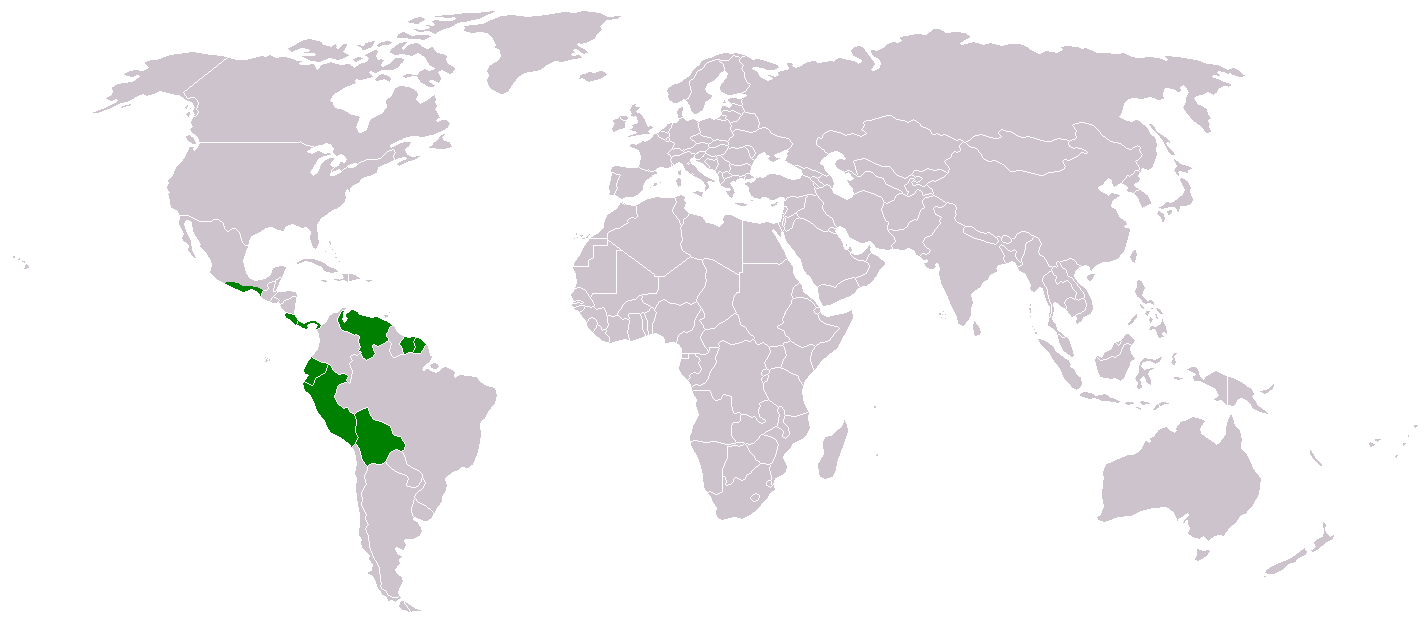
- Range of Senegalia tenuifolia

Synonyms
- Acacia claussenii Benth.; Acacia grandisiliqua (Vell.) Benth.; Acacia martinicensis C. Pres; Acacia microcephala A.Rich.; Acacia paniculata Willd.; Acacia tenuifolia (L.) Willd.; Mimosa grandisiliqua Vell.; Mimosa tenuifolia L.

= Senegalia tenuifolia =

Species of legume

Senegalia tenuifolia is a perennial climbing shrub which is native to Asia, the Caribbean, India and South America. Common names are ara a gato, bejuco cochino, tocino. It is not listed as being a threatened species. Senegalia tenuifolia grows to 8 m high and 10–15 cm in diameter.
