= Senegalia robynsiana =

Conservation status
- Near Threatened (IUCN 2.3)

Scientific classification
- Kingdom: Plantae
- Clade: Tracheophytes
- Clade: Angiosperms
- Clade: Eudicots
- Clade: Rosids
- Order: Fabales
- Family: Fabaceae
- Subfamily: Caesalpinioideae
- Clade: Mimosoid clade
- Genus: Senegalia
- Species: S. robynsiana

Binomial name
- Senegalia robynsiana (Merxm. & A.Schreib.) Kyal. & Boatwr.

Synonyms
- Acacia robynsiana Merxm. & A.Schreib.

Species of legume

Senegalia robynsiana, the whip stick acacia, is a species of plant in the family Fabaceae. It is found only in Namibia.
