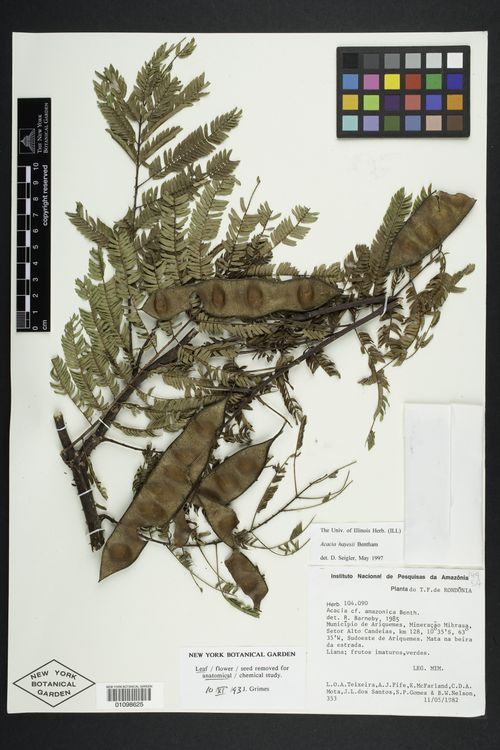
- NY 0101098625

Scientific classification
- Kingdom: Plantae
- Clade: Tracheophytes
- Clade: Angiosperms
- Clade: Eudicots
- Clade: Rosids
- Order: Fabales
- Family: Fabaceae
- Subfamily: Caesalpinioideae
- Clade: Mimosoid clade
- Genus: Senegalia
- Species: S. hayesii

Binomial name
- Senegalia hayesii (Benth.) Britton & Rose

Synonyms
- Acacia acanthophylla (Britton & Rose) Standl. Acacia hayesii Benth. Acacia iguana Micheli; Acacia telensis Standl. Senegalia acanthophylla Britton & Rose; Senegalia iguana (Micheli) Britton & Rose; Senegalia membranacea Britton & Rose; Senegalia rekoana Britton & Rose

= Senegalia hayesii =

Species of legume

Senegalia hayesii is a species of plant in the family Fabaceae. It is native to Bolivia, Costa Rica, Guatemala, Honduras, Mexico, Panama, and Venezuela.

== Description ==
Senegalia hayesii is a woody, clambering vine. The branches are a densely covered in very short soft hairs and have many small prickles. The bipinnate leaves are 30 to 40 cm. long, with 8 to 10 pairs of pinnae, each having 10-20 pairs of final leaflets. the midvein of the leaves is excentric. The flowers occur in spikes which are 10–12 mm long, and have calyces 2 mm long, with corollas 4 mm long.

== Taxonomy ==
It was first described by George Bentham in 1875 as Acacia hayesii, from a specimen collected in Panama by S. Hayes, and was redescribed in 1928 by Nathaniel Lord Britton and Joseph Nelson Rose as Senegalia hayesii.
