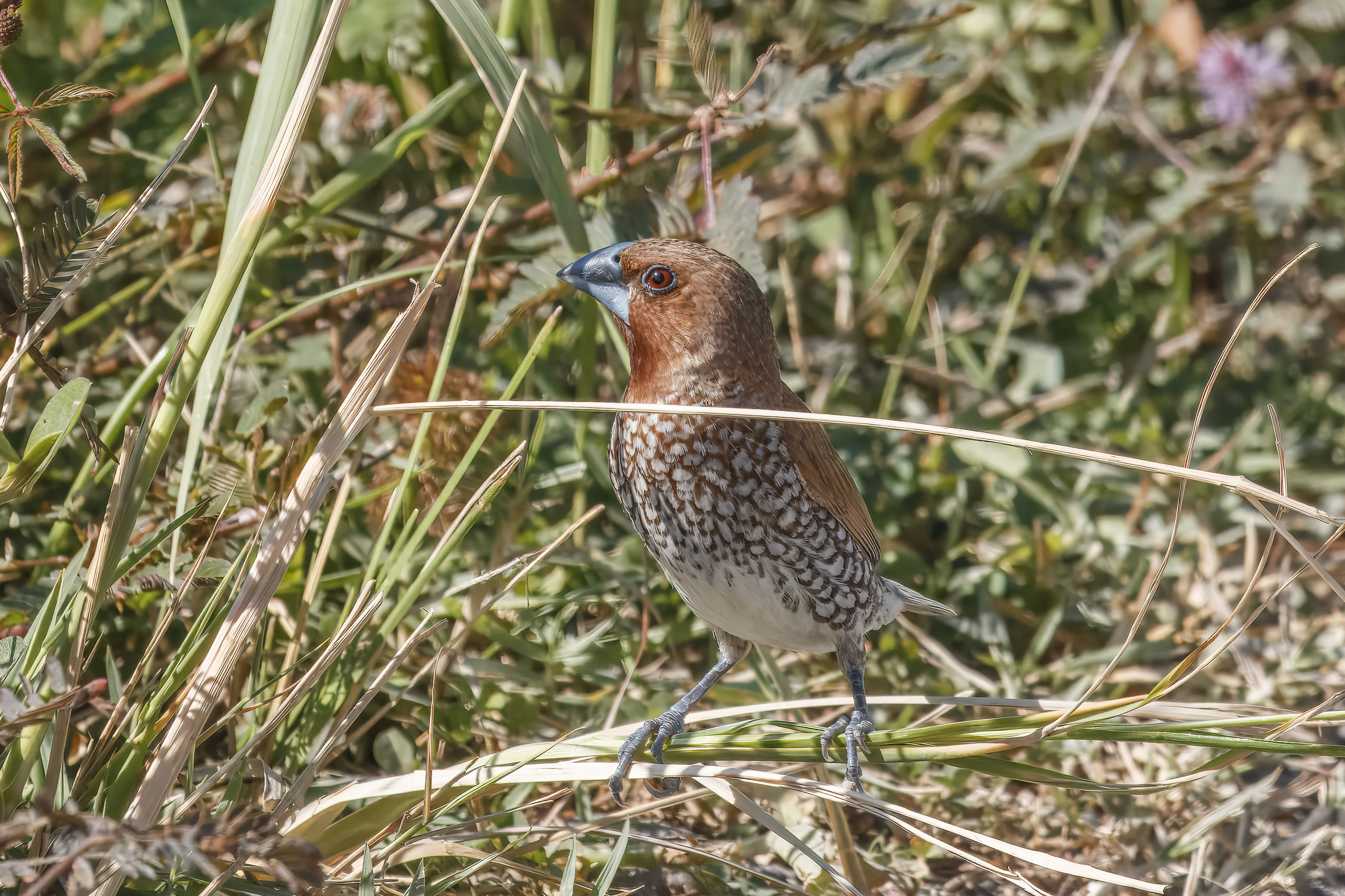
- L. p. nisoria Bali, Indonesia

Conservation status
- Least Concern (IUCN 3.1)

Scientific classification
- Kingdom: Animalia
- Phylum: Chordata
- Class: Aves
- Order: Passeriformes
- Family: Estrildidae
- Genus: Lonchura
- Species: L. punctulata

Binomial name
- Lonchura punctulata (Linnaeus, 1758)
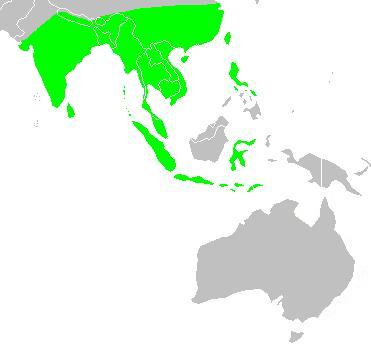
- Native range

Synonyms
- Loxia punctulata Linnaeus, 1758

= Scaly-breasted munia =

Species of bird native to South and Southeast Asia

The scaly-breasted munia or spotted munia (Lonchura punctulata), known in the pet trade as nutmeg mannikin or spice finch, is a sparrow-sized estrildid finch native to tropical Asia. A species of the genus Lonchura, it was formally described and named by Carl Linnaeus in 1758. Its name is based on the distinct scale-like feather markings on the breast and belly. The adult is brown above and has a dark conical bill. The species has 11 subspecies across its range, which differ slightly in size and colour.

This munia eats mainly grass seeds apart from berries and small insects. They forage in flocks and communicate with soft calls and whistles. The species is highly social and may sometimes roost with other species of munias. This species is found in tropical plains and grasslands. Breeding pairs construct dome-shaped nests using grass or bamboo leaves.

The species is endemic to Asia and occurs from India and Sri Lanka east to Indonesia and the Philippines (where it is called mayang pakíng). It has been introduced into many other parts of the world, and feral populations have established in Puerto Rico and Hispaniola, as well as parts of Australia, and the United States of America, with sightings in California. The bird is listed as of least concern by the International Union for Conservation of Nature (IUCN).

== Taxonomy ==
In 1743 the English naturalist George Edwards included an illustration and a description of the scaly-breasted munia in the first volume of his A Natural History of Uncommon Birds. He used the English name "Gowry Bird". Edwards based his hand-coloured etching on a specimen at the London home of Charles du Bois, treasurer to the East India Company. When in 1758 the Swedish naturalist Carl Linnaeus updated his Systema Naturae for the tenth edition, he placed the scaly-breasted munia with the crossbills in the genus Loxia. Linnaeus included a brief description, coined the binomial name Loxia punctulata and cited Edwards' work. Linnaeus specified the locality as "Asia" but this was restricted to Kolkata (Calcutta) by E. C. Stuart Baker in 1926. The species is now placed in the genus Lonchura that was introduced by the English naturalist William Henry Sykes in 1832. The genus name Lonchura combines the Ancient Greek lonkhē meaning "spear-head" or "lance" with oura meaning "tail". The specific epithet is from Modern Latin punctulatus meaning "spotted" or "dotted".

Over its large range there are 11 recognised subspecies. These include the nominate form found in the plains of the Indian subcontinent, including Pakistan, India, Iran, Nepal, Bangladesh and Sri Lanka. The name lineoventer was formerly used for the Indian population. Other populations include subundulata from the eastern Himalayas, yunnanensis of southern China, topela of Thailand, cabanisi of the Philippines and fretensis of Singapore and Sumatra. Island populations include nisoria (Java, Bali, Lombok, Sumbawa), particeps (Sulawesi), baweana (Bawean Island), sumbae (Sumba) and blasii (Flores, Timor and Tanimbar).

- L. p. punctulata (Linnaeus, 1758) – northern Pakistan, India (except northeast), Nepal terai and Sri Lanka
- L. p. subundulata (Godwin-Austen, 1874) – Bhutan, Bangladesh, northeast India (Assam) and west Myanmar
- L. p. yunnanensis Parkes, 1958 – southern China (southeast Xizang, south Sichuan, Yunnan) and north Myanmar
- L. p. topela (R. Swinhoe, 1863) – southern Myanmar, Thailand, southeast China (Taiwan), Hainan Islands, Laos, Cambodia and Vietnam
- L. p. cabanisi (Sharpe, 1890) – north and west Philippines (Luzon, Mindoro, Calauit, Palawan, Panay, Negros, Cebu, Mindanao) and northern Borneo (coastal west Sabah and Brunei)
- L. p. fretensis (Kloss, 1931) – south Malay Peninsula, Singapore, Sumatra and Nias Islands
- L. p. nisoria (Temminck, 1830) – southern Borneo (western & southern Kalimantan), Java, Bali, and western Lesser Sundas (Lombok, Sumbawa)
- L. p. sumbae Mayr, 1944 – Sumba, in western Lesser Sundas
- L. p. blasii (Stresemann, 1912) – central & eastern Lesser Sundas (Flores east to Timor and Tanimbar Islands)
- L. p. baweana Hoogerwerf, 1963 – Bawean Islands, off northeast Java
- L. p. particeps (Riley, 1920) – Sulawesi

The subspecies holmesi (southeast Borneo) is sometimes recognised.

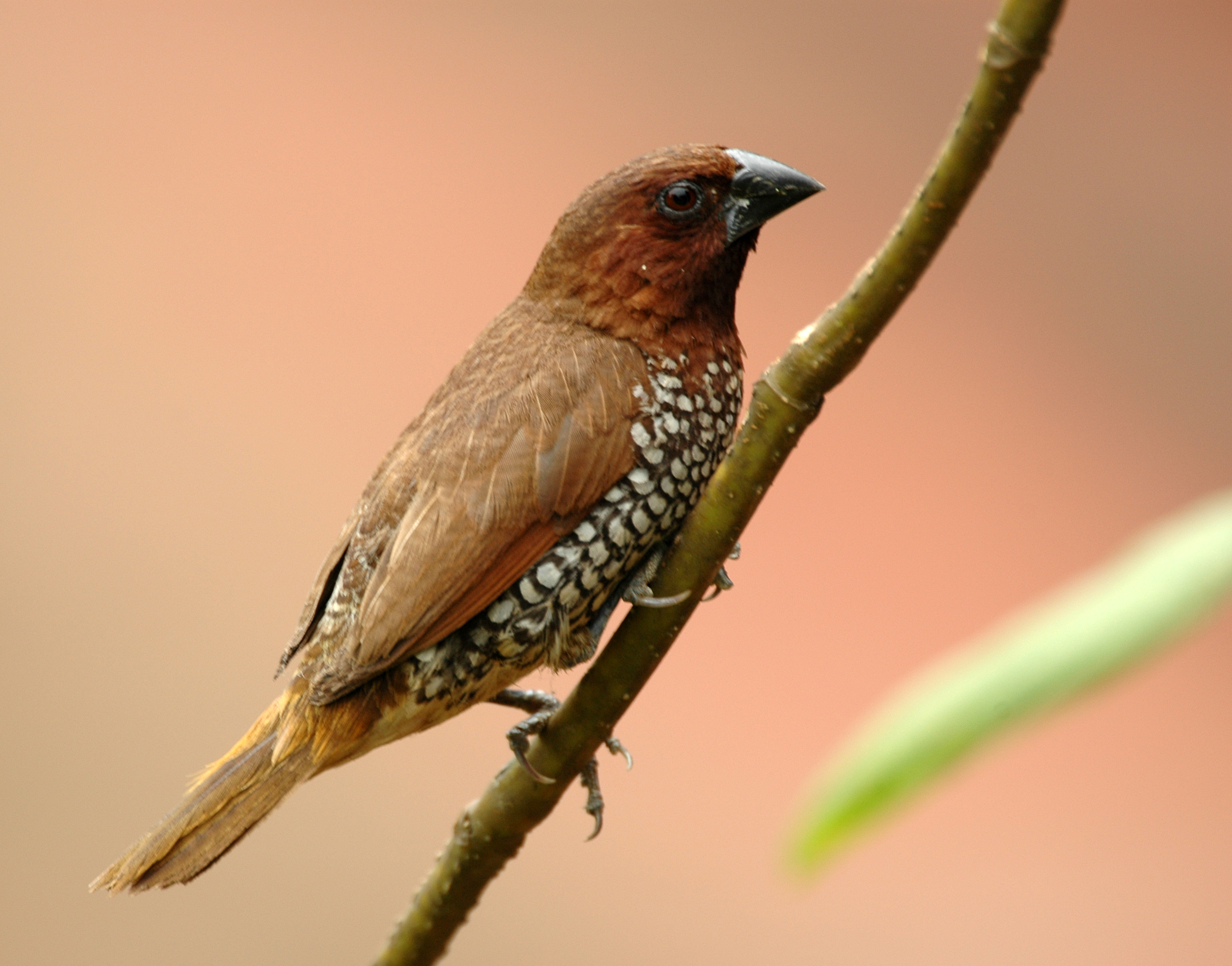
adult L. p. punctulata (India)

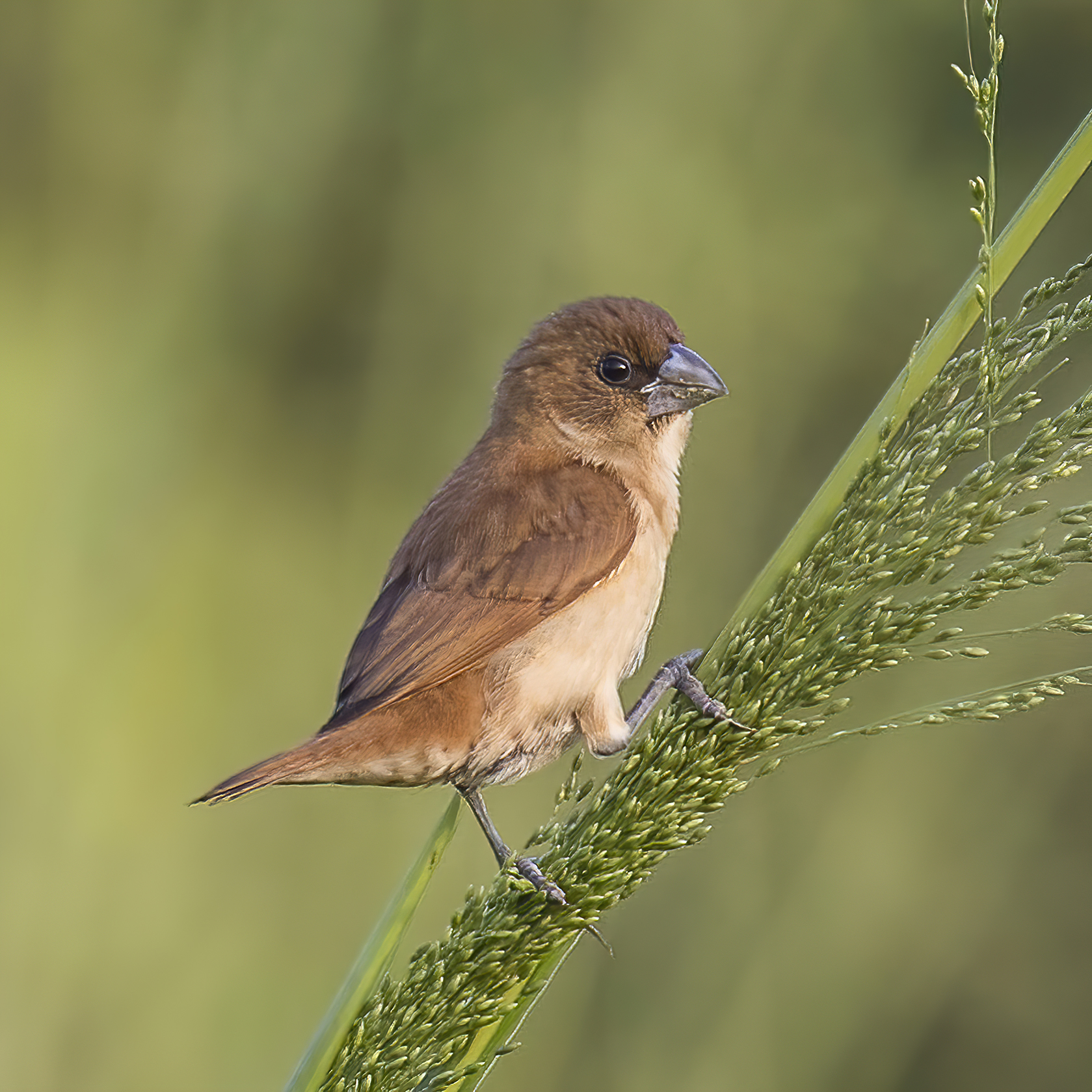
juvenile L. p. punctulata, Sri Lanka

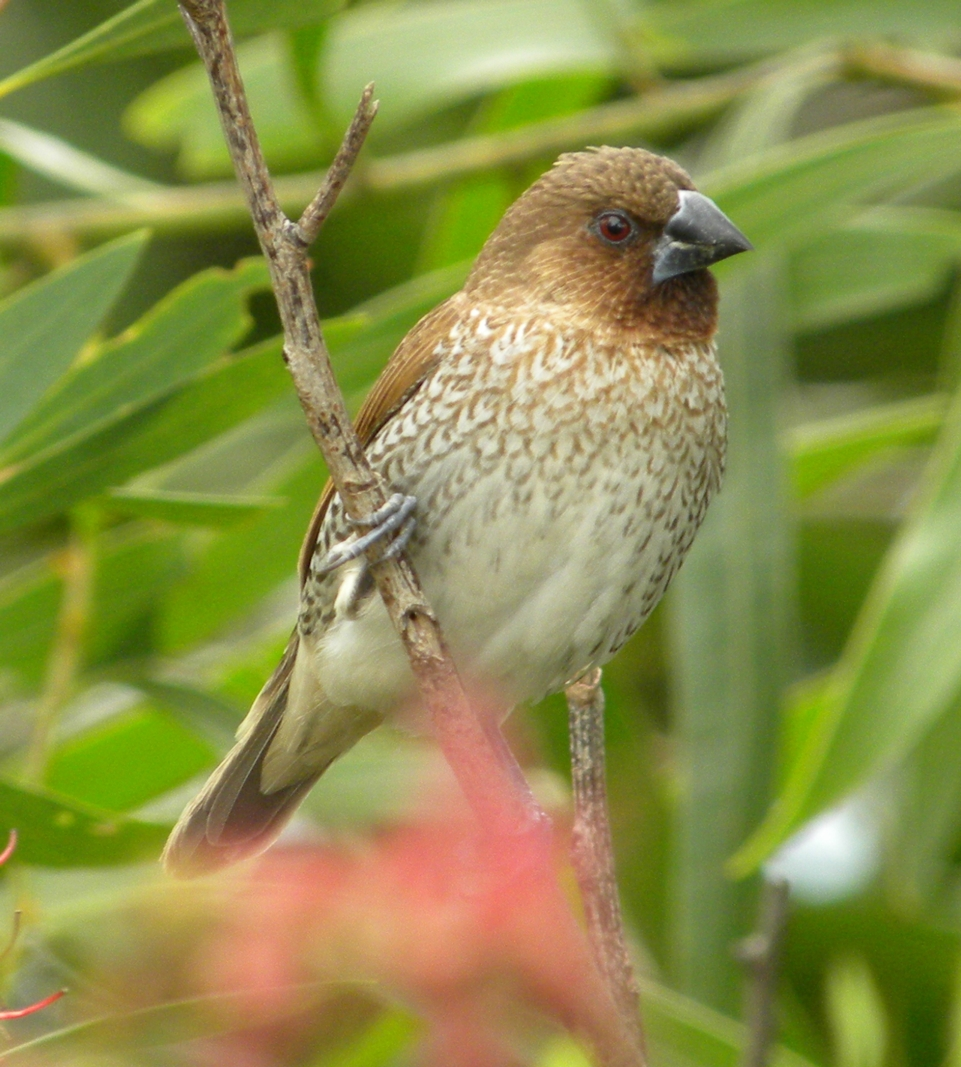
L. m. topela Queensland, Australia

== Description ==
The scaly-breasted munia is about 11–12 centimetres (4.3–4.7 in) long and weighs 12–16 grams (0.026–0.035 lb). The adult has a stubby dark bill typical of grain eating birds, brown upperparts and a dark brown head. The underparts are white with dark scale markings. The sexes are similar, although males have darker markings on the underside and a darker throat than females.

Immature birds have pale brown upperparts, lack the dark head found in adults, and have uniform buff underparts that can be confused with juveniles of other munia species such as the tricoloured munia (Lonchura malacca) across the Asian and island populations and the black-throated munia (Lonchura kelaarti) in parts of India or Sri Lanka.

== Distribution and habitat ==
Scaly-breasted munias are found in a range of habitats but are usually close to water and grassland. In India, they are especially common in paddy fields where they are considered a minor pest on account of their feeding on grain. They are found mainly on the plains, but can be observed in the foothills of the Himalayas, in which they may be present at altitudes near 2,500 m (1.6 mi), and in the Nilgiris, where they are found at altitudes up to 2,100 m (6,900 ft) during the summer. In Pakistan, they are restricted to a narrow region from Swat in the west to Lahore, avoiding the desert zone, and then occurring again in India east of an area between Ludhiana and Mount Abu. The species has also been observed in Kashmir, though this is rare.

Outside their native range, escaped birds frequently establish themselves in areas with a suitable climate and can then colonise new areas nearby. Escaped cagebirds established in the wild and such populations have been recorded in the West Indies (Puerto Rico since 1971), Hawaii (since 1883), Japan and southern United States, mainly in Florida and California. In Oahu, Hawaii, they compete for habitats with the tricoloured munia and tend to be rare where this competitor is present. The species has been introduced to other parts of the world due to its popularity as a cage bird and populations have established in the wild.

== Behaviour and ecology ==
=== Sociality ===
Scaly-breasted munias form flocks of as many as 100 birds. Individuals communicate with calls that include a short whistle, variations of kitty-kitty-kitty, and a sharp chipping alarm note. They sometimes flick their tails and wings vertically or horizontally while hopping about. The tail flicking motion may have evolved from a locomotory intention movement. The exaggerated version of the tail flicking movement may have undergone ritualisation. As a social signal, tail flicking in several other species acts as a signal indicating the intent to fly and helps keep flocks together.

When roosting communally, scaly-breasted munia sit side by side in close contact with each other. The outermost bird often jostles towards the center. Birds in a flock sometimes preen each other, with the soliciting bird usually showing its chin. Allopreening is usually limited to the face and neck. The scaly-breasted munia is rarely hostile but birds will sometimes quarrel without any ritualised posturing.

=== Breeding ===
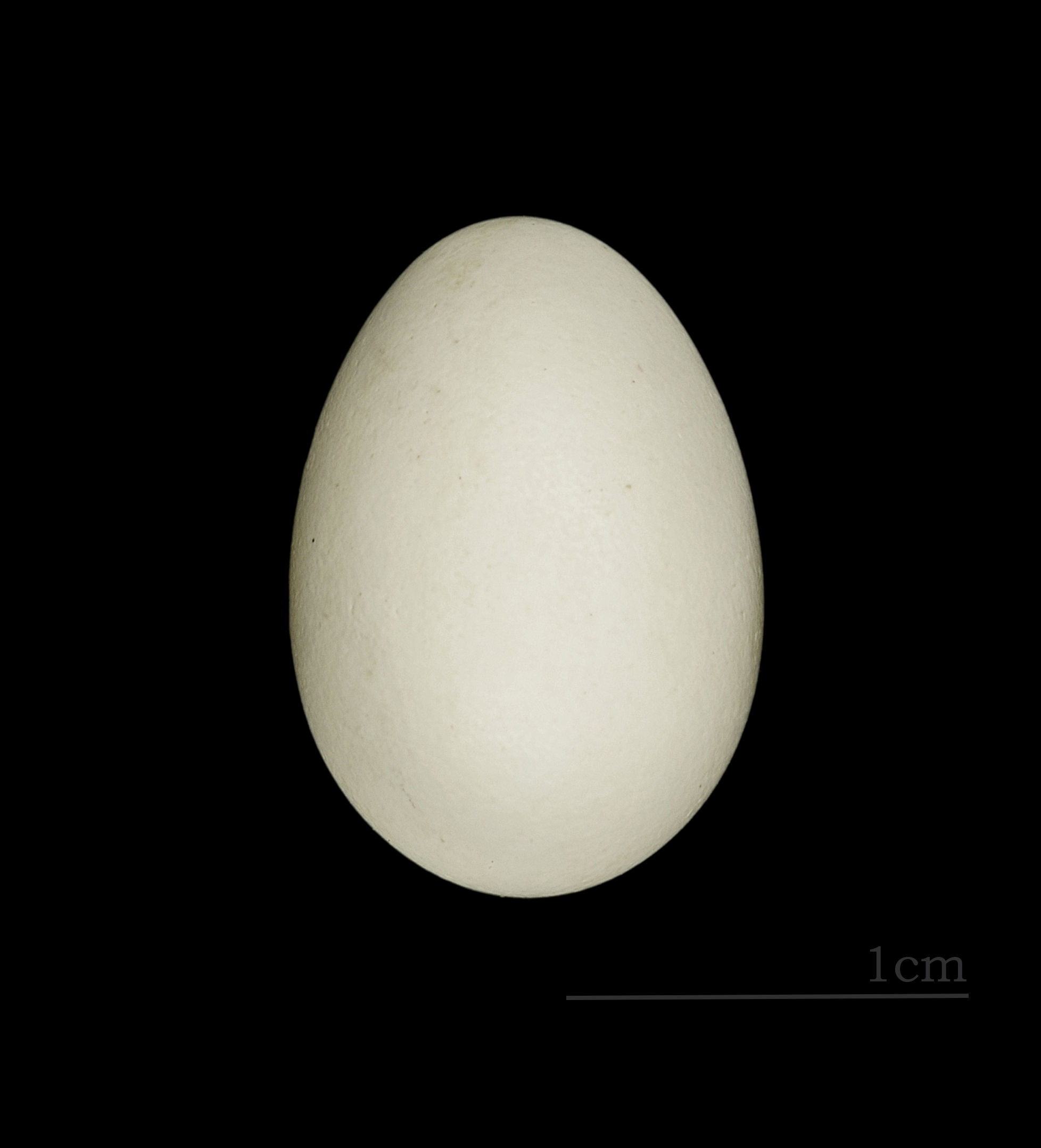
Egg of scaly-breasted munia

The breeding season is during the summer rainy season (mainly June to August and also in October season in India) but can vary. Laboratory studies have found that long day illumination and high humidity trigger gonadal growth. The song of the male is very soft but complex and variable, audible only at close range. This song described as a jingle consists of a series of high notes followed by a croaky rattle and ending in a slurred whistle. When singing the male sits in what is called the slope posture—erect with the head feathers raised.

Lonchura punctulata carrying nest material in its bill

There are two types of slope posture, a pre-copulatory one and an ordinary one. The pre-copulatory behaviour of scaly-breasted munia includes a sequence of actions. The first involves either the male or female playing with nest-material. As soon as a bird has arranged the nest material in its bill, it begins to fly around in a zigzag path. Once a bird lands close to its partner, the male bends towards the female and wipes its bill. The male then sings with movements of the body. The female invites mounting with tail quivering. The nest is a large domed structure loosely woven from blades of grass, bamboo or other leaves with a side entrance and is placed in a tree or under the eaves of a house. A study in southern India found the preferred nesting trees to be Toddalia asiatica, Gymnosporia montana and Acacia chundra, especially short and bushy ones in areas with low canopy cover. The nest opening is located to face downwind of the most frequent wind direction. In northern India, they preferred isolated Acacia nilotica in non-urban areas but used Thuja orientalis and Polyalthia longifolia in urban gardens.

Scaly-breasted munia clutches usually contain four to six eggs, but can contain up to ten. Both sexes build the nest and incubate the eggs, which hatch in 10 to 16 days.

The species is extensively used as a brood host by the parasitic pin-tailed whydah in Southern California (where both species are feral) with the munia raising the whydah's chicks as its own. This relationship is novel, as the two species do not naturally co-occur in their native ranges, and had no established evolutionary relationship as parasite and host.

== Food and foraging ==
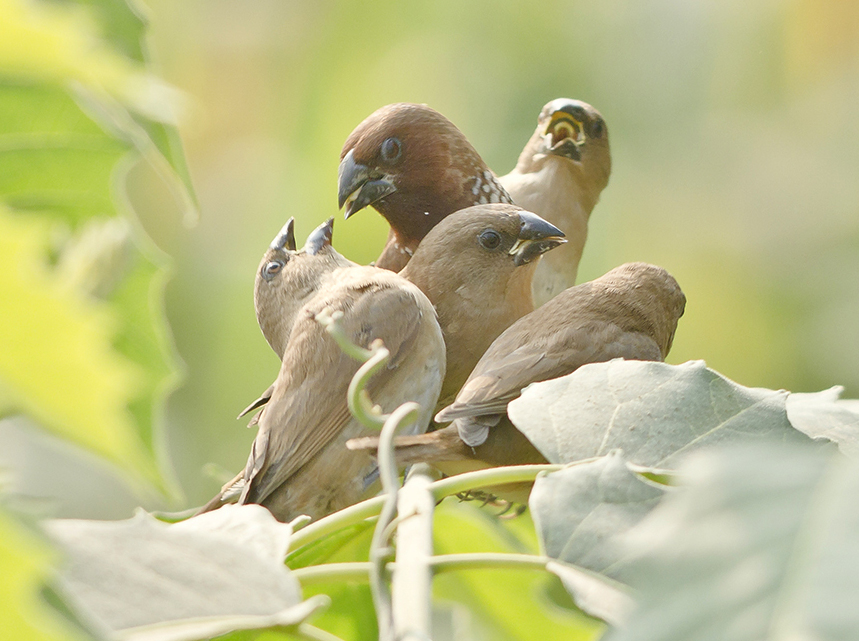
Adult feeding young

The scaly-breasted munia feeds mainly on grass seeds, small berries such as those of Lantana, and insects. Although the bill is suited for crushing small grains, they do not show lateral movements of the lower mandible that e.g. greenfinches show, which help in dehusking seeds. Like some other munias, they may also feed on algae, a rich protein source, prior to the breeding season.

The ease of maintaining these birds in captivity has made them popular for studying behaviour and physiology. Feeding behaviour can be predicted by the optimal foraging theory, where animals minimise time and energy spent to maximise food intake. This theory has been tested by studying the strategies used by scaly-breasted munias to increase their feeding efficacy.

=== Flock size tradeoffs ===
Studies on foraging have examined the effect of group size in reducing time spent on predator vigilance, thereby increasing feeding efficiency. According to the "many-eyes" hypothesis, a reduction in the individual time spent on vigilance against threats in larger groups allows for more time to be spent on searching for food and feeding. Vigilance is greatest among solitary individuals and reduces as the group size increases to about four. The birds collect seeds more quickly in larger groups, reflecting a decrease in individual vigilance, a decrease in handling time, and an increase in both search speed and focus when foraging.

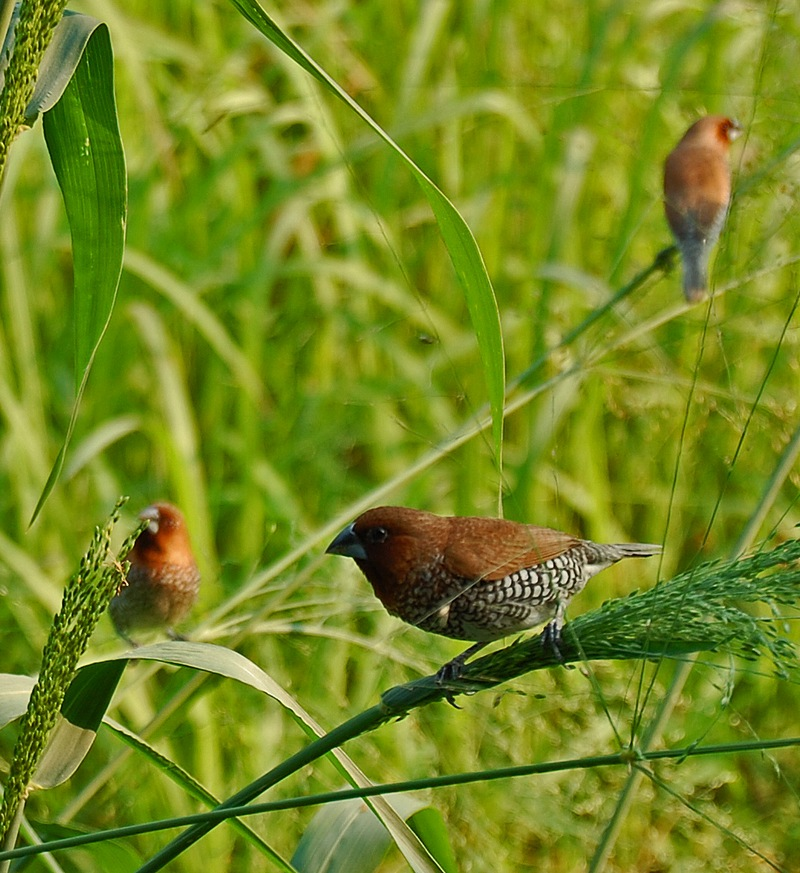
A foraging group

Individuals may also take advantage of group foraging by "joining" members that have found food. The options to seek food or to join others that have discovered food involves information sharing and has been studied through what are termed "producer-scrounger models". A cost associated with group foraging is increased resource competition, which in turn may reduce anti-predatory vigilance due to the intensity of foraging. Some studies show that increased competition results in a decreased feeding rate.

=== Foraging models ===
When foraging, scaly-breasted munia can search as individuals or search for others that have found food and join them. The economic consequences of the decision to join others has been modeled in two ways: the producer-scrounger model and the information sharing model. These models are based on hypotheses that differ in the degree of compatibility that is assumed between the two food and joining opportunity search modes.

The information sharing model assumes that individuals search concurrently for finding and joining opportunities while the producer-scrounger model assumes that the search modes are mutually exclusive. Hopping with the head facing up and downward are observed to be statistically associated with the frequencies of a bird's joining and finding, respectively. When the expected stable frequency of the scrounger tactic was altered by changing the availability of seeds, the relative frequency of hopping with the head up changed accordingly. When the seed distribution made the scrounger tactic unprofitable, the frequency of hopping with the head up diminished and appears to support the predictions of the producer-scrounger model.

Studies show that scaly-breasted munias tend to adopt the scrounger tactic when food is more clumped and when the group size increases. When most foragers adopt scrounging, the time taken to discover new food patches is greater.

=== Vigilance ===
Most social foragers must search for food while also avoiding predators. It has been suggested that individuals that play scrounger could also, by virtue of their head position, be alert for predators and hence contribute to antipredatory vigilance. If the scrounger tactic is compatible with antipredatory vigilance, then an increase in antipredatory vigilance should lead to the detection of more joining opportunities, and hence more joining. When stationary, the head-up tactic has been shown to be associated with antipredatory vigilance. However scanning while hopping does not aid in vigilance and it is thought that the scrounger tactic is incompatible with antipredatory vigilance in the scaly-breasted munia.

=== Specialised foraging ===
Scaly-breasted munias have variable competitive behaviour that allows them to exploit scarce resources. There are two foraging alternatives: producers that make the food available and scroungers that steal food found by the producers. Studies show that these choices lead to a stable equilibrium within a group. When individuals are free to choose between producer and scrounger, frequency dependent selection results in a stable mixture of both behaviour where each receives similar payoff. Studies indicate that if most of the population consists of producers, then scrounging behaviour is favoured by natural selection because there is plenty of food to steal. On the other hand, if most birds exhibit scrounging then the competition for stealing is so great that producing is favoured.

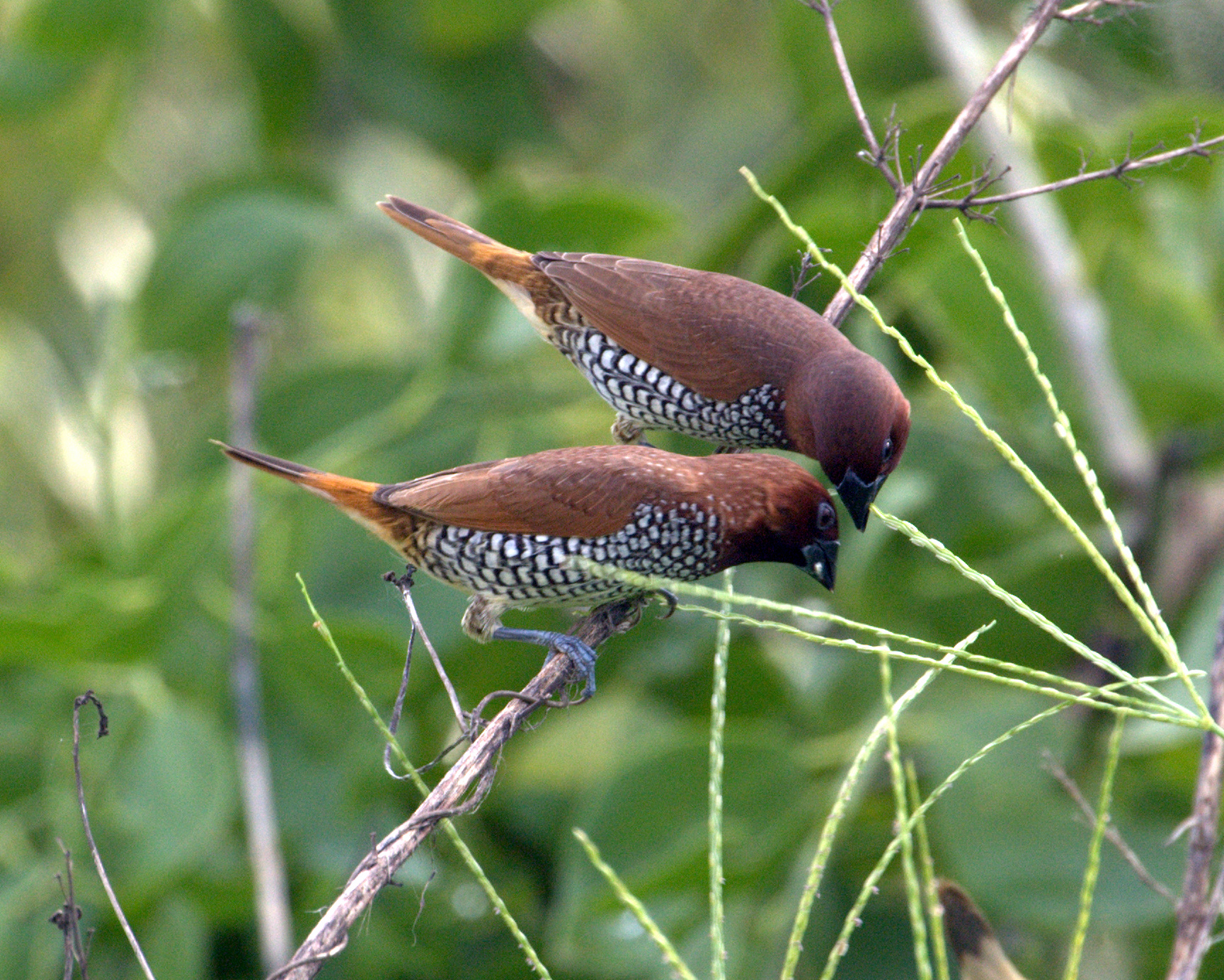
A pair feeding on grains

Three hypotheses might account for consistent foraging specialisations across individuals: food source variation, phenotypic differences, and frequency dependent-choice. The food source variation hypothesis predicts that individuals will specialise when the use of two skills is more costly than specialist foraging. The phenotypic differences hypothesis proposes that individuals differ in their ability to use each foraging skill and stably specialise on the most profitable one. The pattern of specialisation is expected to be stable although the number of individuals that use a given skill depends on the phenotypic composition of the flock. The frequency dependent choice hypothesis also proposes that individuals specialise on the most profitable skill, but the profitability of each alternative decreases as the number of phenotypically identical foragers gradually specialise on each skill when initially given two equally profitable alternatives. At equilibrium, individual payoffs should be independent of the pattern of specialisation. Individuals in flocks adjusted their use of the two skills and two birds in each flock specialised on a different skill resulting in a variant of both the food source variation hypothesis and frequency dependent choice hypothesis.

Aviary experiments conducted with captive flocks of scaly-breasted munia have tested whether producers and scroungers reach the predicted stable equilibrium frequency (see Evolutionarily stable strategy) when individuals are free to choose either behaviour. The numbers choosing either producers and scrounger strategies have been shown to converge on stable frequencies while demonstrating that variation in tactics arise through frequency dependent pay-offs from the choice of different feeding strategies.

Furthermore, foraging birds may feed actively on the substrate or pick grains dropped on the ground and these strategies may be chosen according to the situation. Early departures occur more often when expected searching time decreases and when competition intensity increases. Competition intensity is expected to increase when more scroungers are present or when patches are smaller.

=== Prey crypsis ===
Since producers search for food and scroungers wait for opportunities to join, prey crypsis imposes a producer specific cost that shifts the producer scrounger equilibria towards more scrounging. Prey crypsis resulted in increased latency to eat the seed and increased number of detection errors. Moreover, the presence of a competitor negatively affected foraging efficiency under cryptic backgrounds. The foraging efficiency of individuals that had previously foraged with a competitor on cryptic seeds remained low even after the competitor had been removed. Thus, the costs of foraging on cryptic prey may be greater for social foragers than for solitary foragers.

=== Resource defence ===
Recent models of economic defence in a group-foraging context predict that the frequency of aggressive interactions should decline as resource density increases. Studies with scaly-breasted munia show that the intensity of aggressive encounters was highest when patch location was signaled, and the effect of changing resource density depended on whether patch location was signaled or not. Signaling patch location was equivalent to making the resources more spatially predictable. Changing patch density had no effect on the number of aggressive encounters when the location of food was not signaled. When food location was signaled, increasing patch density resulted in the predicted decrease in the number of aggressive encounters.

== Conservation ==
The scaly-breasted munia is an abundant species and classified as least concern on the IUCN Red List. The species occupies an extremely large range, and its population, while still unquantified, is large and stable. The scaly-breasted munia is not globally threatened and is common to very common throughout most of its range. However, some populations are dwindled due to the increase of bird cagings.

In many areas it is regarded as an agricultural pest, feeding in large flocks on cultivated cereals such as rice. In Southeast Asia, the scaly-breasted munia is trapped in large numbers for Buddhist life release rituals. While most birds are eventually released, the post-release mortality rate can be as high as 90%.
