= Senegalia montis-salinarum =

Conservation status
- Endangered (IUCN 3.1)

Scientific classification
- Kingdom: Plantae
- Clade: Tracheophytes
- Clade: Angiosperms
- Clade: Eudicots
- Clade: Rosids
- Order: Fabales
- Family: Fabaceae
- Subfamily: Caesalpinioideae
- Clade: Mimosoid clade
- Genus: Senegalia
- Species: S. montis-salinarum

Binomial name
- Senegalia montis-salinarum N.Hahn

Species of legume

Senegalia montis-salinarum, is a species of thorn tree that is native to two separate localities in the Soutpansberg range in Limpopo, South Africa. The total population is estimated at no more than 250 adult trees. Based on its morphology, it is assigned to the S. burkei species complex.

== Habitat ==
It grows on rocky scree slopes in the hot rain shadow of the Soutpansberg range.

== Description ==
It is a multi-stemmed tree. It has smaller flowers than A. burkei and produces more seeds. The wood is soft and semi-succulent, and dead wood decays quickly.

== Status ==
It may qualify as endangered due to the small population size and the proximity of the type locality to Coal of Africa's Makhado Colliery project.
