= Senegalia condyloclada =

Conservation status
- Near Threatened (IUCN 2.3)

Scientific classification
- Kingdom: Plantae
- Clade: Tracheophytes
- Clade: Angiosperms
- Clade: Eudicots
- Clade: Rosids
- Order: Fabales
- Family: Fabaceae
- Subfamily: Caesalpinioideae
- Clade: Mimosoid clade
- Genus: Senegalia
- Species: S. condyloclada

Binomial name
- Senegalia condyloclada (Chiov.) Kyal. & Boatwr.

Synonyms
- Acacia condyloclada Chiov.

Species of legume

Senegalia condyloclada is a species of plant in the family Fabaceae. It is found in Ethiopia, Kenya, and Somalia. It is threatened by habitat loss.
