= Senegalia thomasii =

Scientific classification
- Kingdom: Plantae
- Clade: Embryophytes
- Clade: Tracheophytes
- Clade: Angiosperms
- Clade: Eudicots
- Clade: Rosids
- Order: Fabales
- Family: Fabaceae
- Subfamily: Caesalpinioideae
- Clade: Mimosoid clade
- Genus: Senegalia
- Species: S. thomasii

Binomial name
- Senegalia thomasii (Harms) Kyal. & Boatwr.

Species of plant

Senegalia thomasii is a species within the family Fabaceae that grows as a straggling shrub or tree. It is commonly found in Kenya.

== Description ==
The species is a shrub or small tree that grows up to 12 m tall, its branches are elongated and straight or virgately branched, young branches are commonly grayish in color and are densely pubescent. It has prickles in threes that are usually blackish and slightly below the nodes, prickles can be up to 7.5 mm long. Leaves: 1–2 pairs of pinnae, 7–15 leaflets per pinna, leaf outline is oblong; petiole is up to 2 cm long and rachis is up to 8 cm long. Inflorescence: spikes up to 10 cm long, calyx 3–4, glabrous and up to 5 mm long, corolla 6, about 5–7 mm long and also glabrous. Fruits are brown to yellowish brown pods containing circular to lenticular shaped seeds.
