= Senegalia venosa =

Conservation status
- Endangered (IUCN 3.1)

Scientific classification
- Kingdom: Plantae
- Clade: Tracheophytes
- Clade: Angiosperms
- Clade: Eudicots
- Clade: Rosids
- Order: Fabales
- Family: Fabaceae
- Subfamily: Caesalpinioideae
- Clade: Mimosoid clade
- Genus: Senegalia
- Species: S. venosa

Binomial name
- Senegalia venosa (Hochst. ex Benth.) Kyal. & Boatwr.

Synonyms
- Acacia venosa Hochst. ex Benth.

Species of legume

Senegalia venosa is a species of plant in the family Fabaceae. It is found in Eritrea and Ethiopia. It is threatened by habitat loss.
