= Senegalia flagellaris =

Conservation status
- Vulnerable (IUCN 2.3)

Scientific classification
- Kingdom: Plantae
- Clade: Tracheophytes
- Clade: Angiosperms
- Clade: Eudicots
- Clade: Rosids
- Order: Fabales
- Family: Fabaceae
- Subfamily: Caesalpinioideae
- Clade: Mimosoid clade
- Genus: Senegalia
- Species: S. flagellaris

Binomial name
- Senegalia flagellaris (Thulin) Kyal. & Boatwr.

Synonyms
- Acacia flagellaris Thulin

Species of legume

Senegalia flagellaris is a species of plant in the family Fabaceae. It is found only in Somalia.
