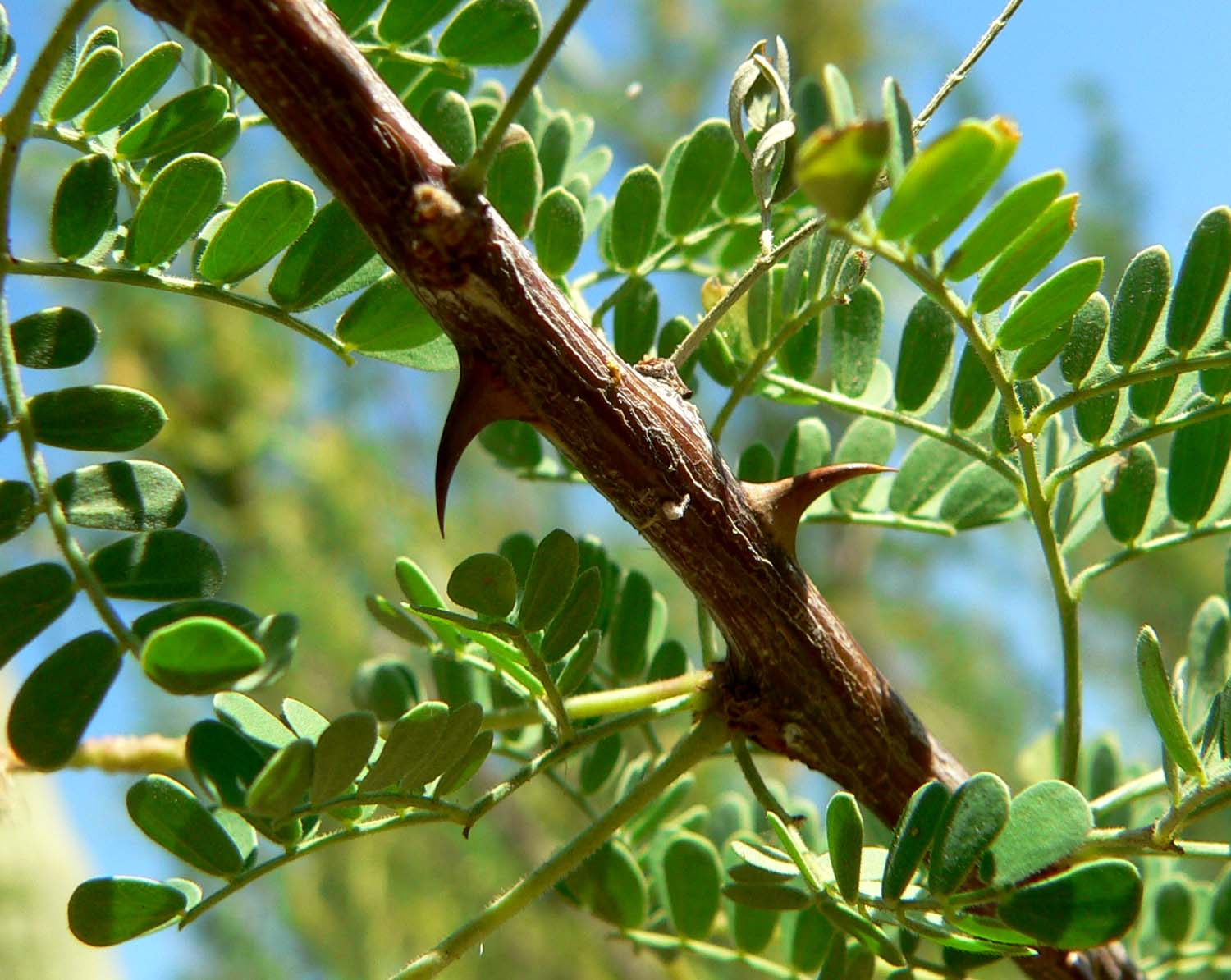

Conservation status
- Secure (NatureServe)

Scientific classification
- Kingdom: Plantae
- Clade: Tracheophytes
- Clade: Angiosperms
- Clade: Eudicots
- Clade: Rosids
- Order: Fabales
- Family: Fabaceae
- Subfamily: Caesalpinioideae
- Clade: Mimosoid clade
- Genus: Senegalia
- Species: S. greggii

Binomial name
- Senegalia greggii (A.Gray) Britton & Rose
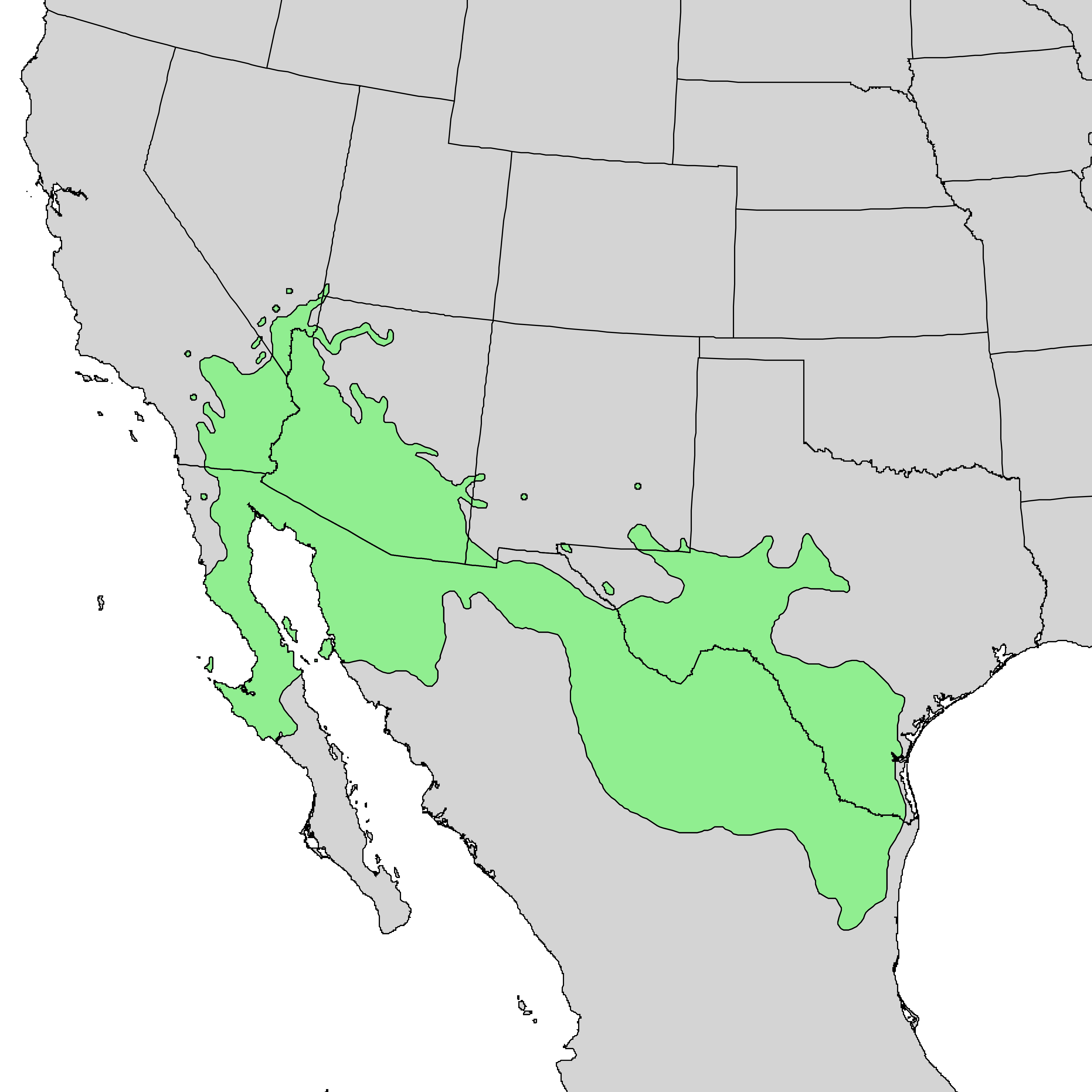
- Natural range

Synonyms
- Acacia greggii

= Senegalia greggii =

Tree species in the pea family

Senegalia greggii, formerly known as Acacia greggii, is a species of tree in the genus Senegalia native to the southwestern United States and northern Mexico. Common names include acacia bush, catclaw acacia, catclaw mesquite, Gregg's catclaw, paradise flower, wait-a-minute bush, and wait-a-bit tree; these names mostly come from the fact that the tree has numerous hooked prickles with the shape and size of a cat's claw which tend to hook onto passers-by; the hooked person must stop ("wait a minute") to remove the prickles carefully to avoid injury or shredded clothing. (The common name "cat's claw" is also used to refer to several other plant species, including Uncaria tomentosa, a woody vine found in the tropical jungles of South and Central America.) The specific epithet greggii refers to Josiah Gregg, a 19th-century author, explorer, and amateur naturalist of the American Southwest and northern Mexico.

== Description ==
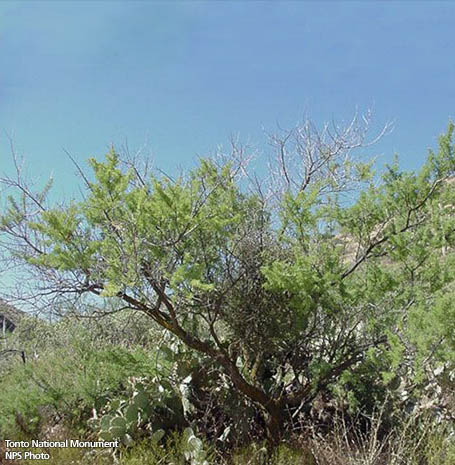
Senegalia greggii

It is a large shrub or small tree growing to 10–15 m (33–49 ft) tall with a trunk up to 20–30 cm (7.9–11.8 in) diameter. The grey-green leaves are deciduous, and bipinnate, divided into 1-3 pairs of pinnae, each pinna 2–3 cm (0.79–1.18 in) long with 10-18 leaflets that are 3–6 mm (0.12–0.24 in). Pinnae are most frequently in two pairs, with the proximal pair perpendicular to the petiolule and the distal pair forming a V at the tip.

The blooms are produced in dense cylindrical spikes of numerous flowers, each individual flower with five cream colored 3 mm (0.12 in) petals and numerous creamy yellow 6 mm (0.24 in) stamens. The fruit is a flat, twisted legume (pod) 6–15 cm (2.4–5.9 in) long, containing generally 3 to 5 hard, flattened, medium brown seeds. The seed pod is constricted between seeds (a loment), and seed dispersal occurs both through dehiscence and breaks at these constrictions.

== Taxonomy ==
Senegalia greggii was scientifically described in 1852 by Asa Gray and named Acacia greggii. In 1928 it was moved to the genus Senegalia by Nathaniel Lord Britton and Joseph Nelson Rose. Together with its genus it is classified in the Fabaceae family. Although it has no accepted varieties, it does have one variety name among its five synonyms.

Table of Synonyms
Name	Year	Rank	Notes
Acacia durandiana Buckley	1861	species	= het.
Acacia greggii A.Gray	1852	species	≡ hom.
Acacia greggii var. arizonica Isely	1969	variety	= het.
Acacia rotundata Benth.	1875	species	= het.
Mimosa rotundata Pav. ex Benth.	1875	species	= het., not validly publ.
Notes: ≡ homotypic synonym ; = heterotypic synonym

== Range and habitat ==
Catclaw mesquite is native to the southwestern United States and northern Mexico. In the southwestern US it is found in California sporadically as far north as Humboldt County, but mainly in southern parts of the state. It is likewise a species of southern Nevada and is only found in Washington County in the southwestern corner of Utah. It is common in much of Arizona and southern New Mexico, but only grows in the Trans-Pecos and southernmost parts of Texas.

In Northwestern Mexico it is native to three states, Baja California, Baja California Sur, and Sonora. In the northeast it is found in seven of eleven states including Chihuahua, Durango, Coahuila, Zacatecas, Nuevo León, and Tamaulipas in the north and Hidalgo to the south.

== Ecology ==
Senegalia greggii is most common in arroyos where its roots have access to deep water. Its seeds require physical scarification in order to germinate. This effectively prevents germination unless a flash flood disturbs the area and deposits enough water to increase the likelihood that seedlings will be able to establish deep enough roots to survive the dry season. Catclaw is fully drought deciduous and will usually lack leaves for most of the year. S. greggii has extrafloral nectaries, a trait shared with other senegalias. A tentative connection has been made between these glands and insects that would suggest a mutualistic relationship (as found in other Senegalia species). Ants are known to use the glands as a source of food and water, and may provide some defense for the plant against herbivorous insects. Like other arroyo trees in family Fabaceae, S. greggii is frequently afflicted with Desert Mistletoe, Phoradendron californicum. Unlike other legumes, S. greggii is not known to form root nodule associations with nitrogen-fixing bacteria.

It is argued that this species may be an example of an evolutionary anachronism, in which the range and renewal of the species is limited due to the extinction of the mammalian megafauna responsible for seed dispersal. Within this model, the scarification required to germinate the seeds would have occurred during the chewing and digestion of the fruit by a large mammal, who later passes the seed intact some distance from the original tree.

Gambel quail eat the seeds. Antelope browse the foliage, but more delicate species may do so cautiously on account of the thorns.

== Ethnobotany ==
Senegalia greggii, even though it is used as forage for livestock, contains a potentially poisonous cyanogenic glycoside called prunasin. Mature seeds are to be avoided, as the native people did. The young, unripe beans of S. greggii were gathered and eaten by desert tribes of North America, including the Chemehuevi of the Southern Paiute, the Pima, and the Cahuilla. The Cahuilla also ground the dried beans for mush and cakes, while the Havasupai ground it to make flour for bread. The Seri ground the beans to meal then mixed it with water and sea lion oil for porridge. The Diegueno used S. greggii as food for domesticated animals.

The Pimas and Tohono O'odham ate the seeds as pinole. The Cahuilla and Pima used the fibers for sturdy construction material and firewood. The Havasupai split the twigs and used them for basketry, but also used the twigs as a broom to brush off metates. The O'odham used the broken twigs for baskets, and were curved to make intricate weaves in the baskets. The Pima used the dried bushes to pile them to make a brush fence. The branches were used to make cradle frames as well.

The Tohono O'odham fitted the branches around deer hunters' heads to make a disguise, and the buds and blossoms were dried to make perfume sachets by the women. The sticks were also used to dislodge saguaro fruits from the cactus body, and rods were curved to flesh animal skins. The Akimel O'odham made bows out of the wood.

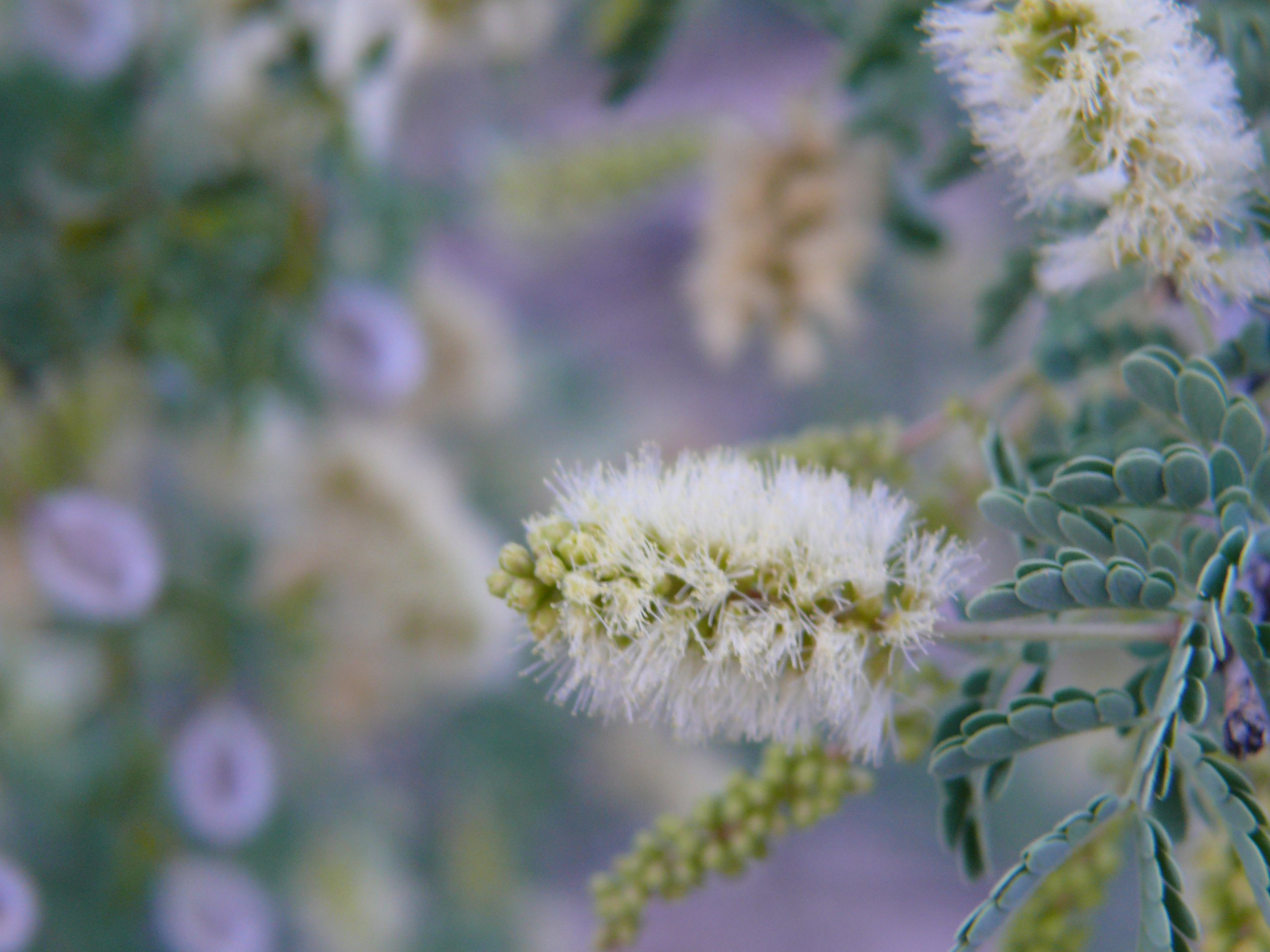
Senegalia greggii flower

== Some chemical compounds found in Senegalia greggii ==
- Beta-methylphenethylamine
- Catechin
- Fisetin
- Hordenine
- Phenethylamine
- Quercetin
- Tyramine

== Gallery ==
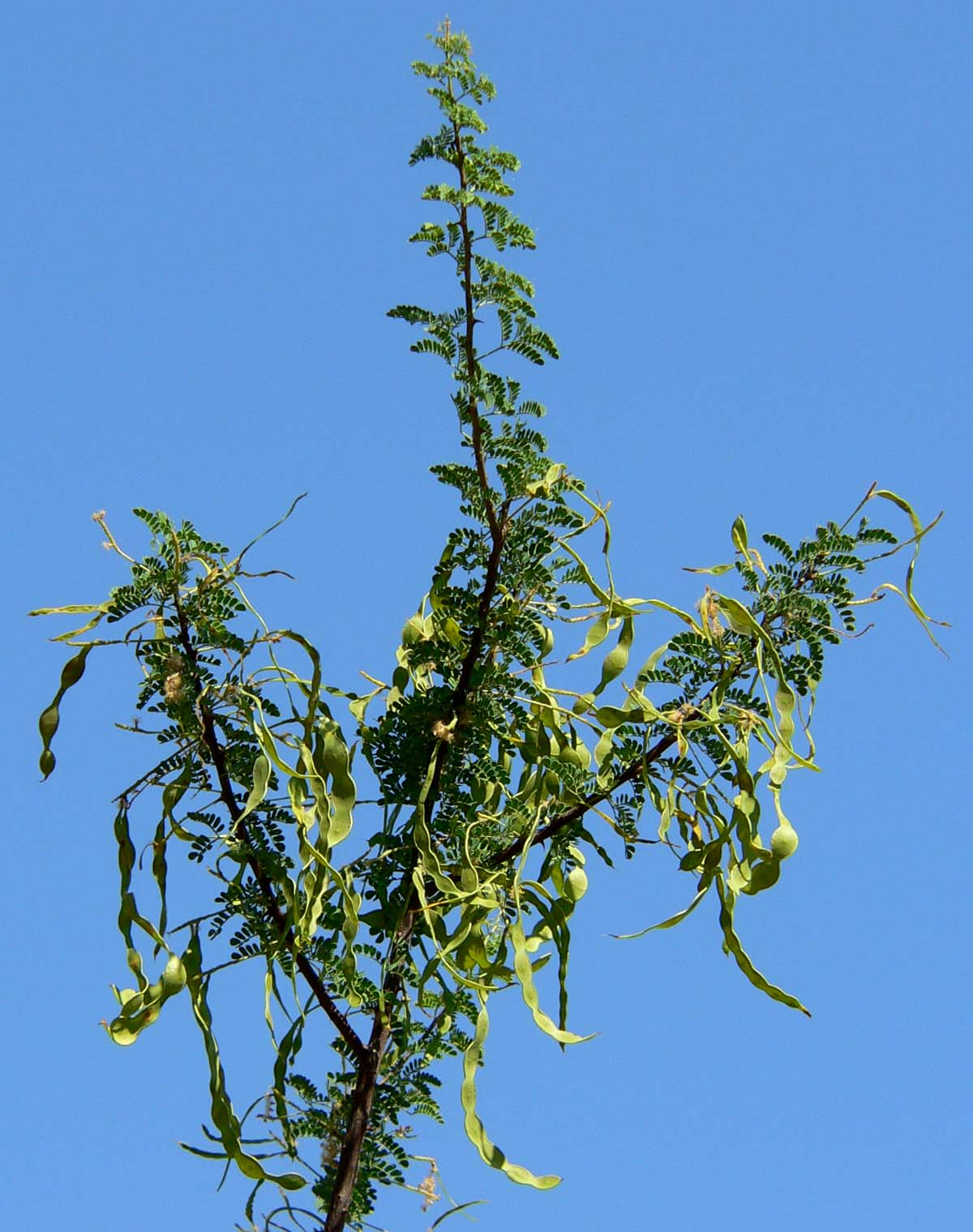
Senegalia greggii branch

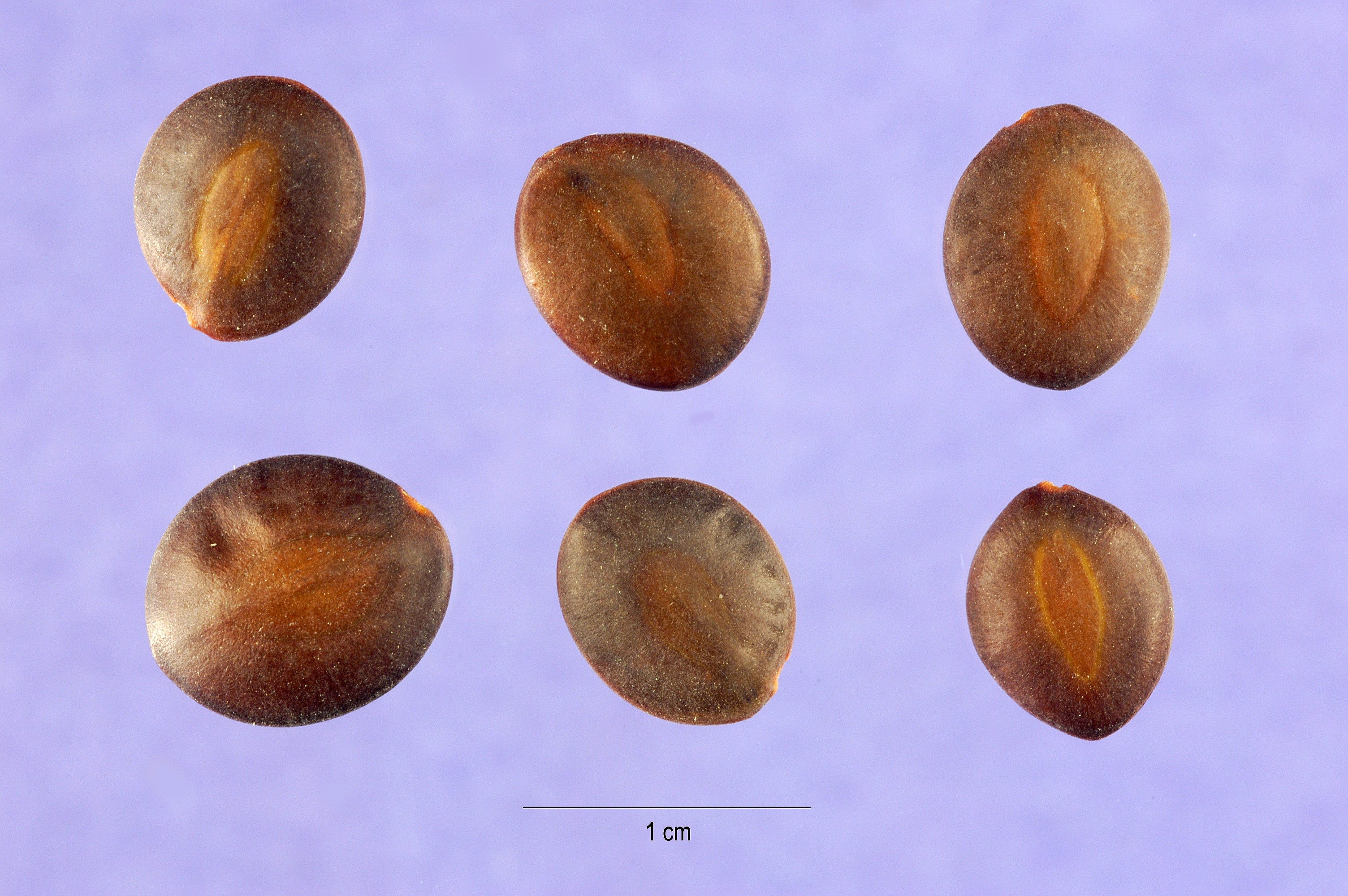
Senegalia greggii seeds

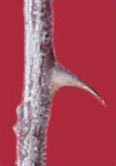
Catclaw Acacia thorn

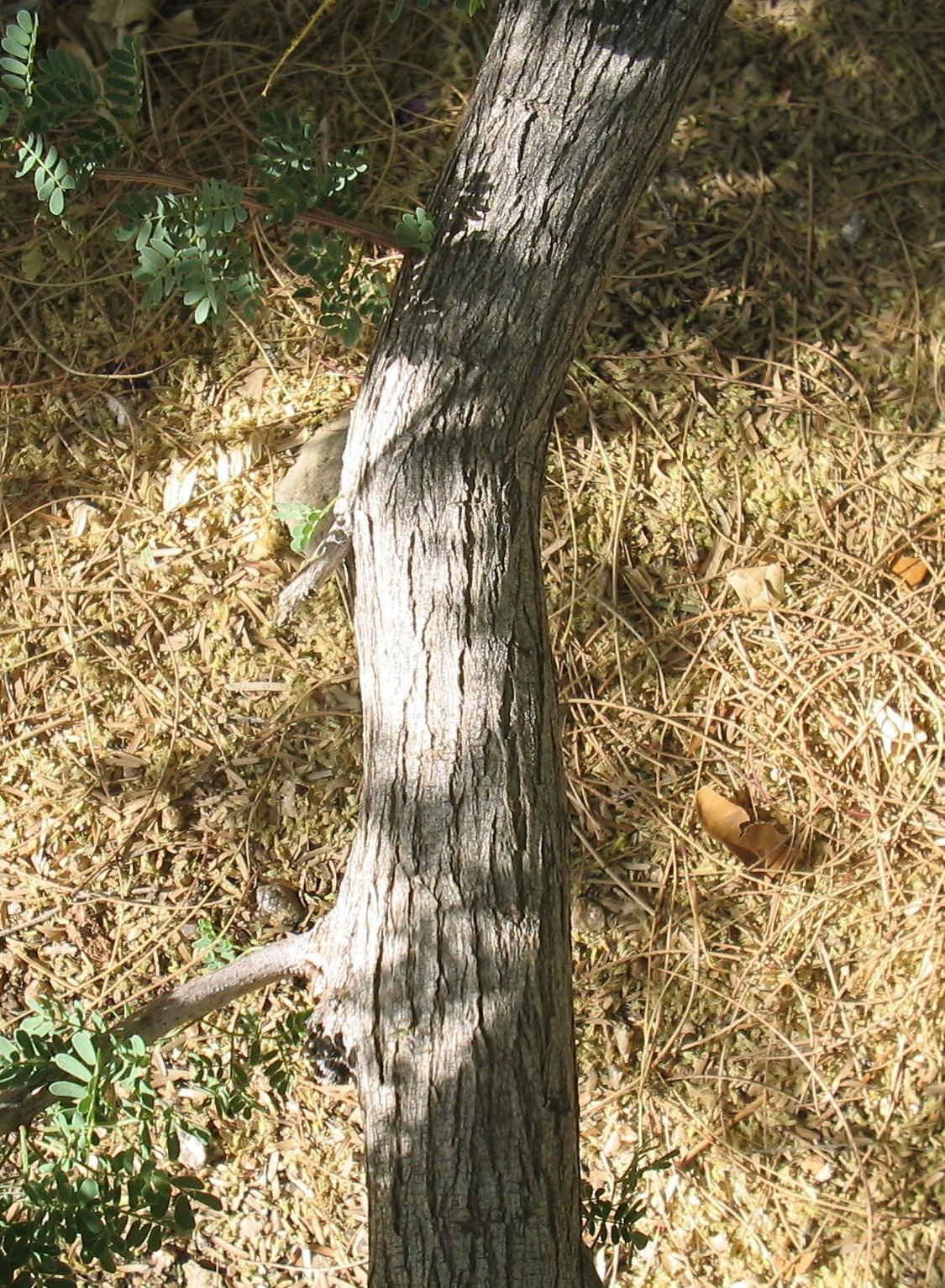
Bark
