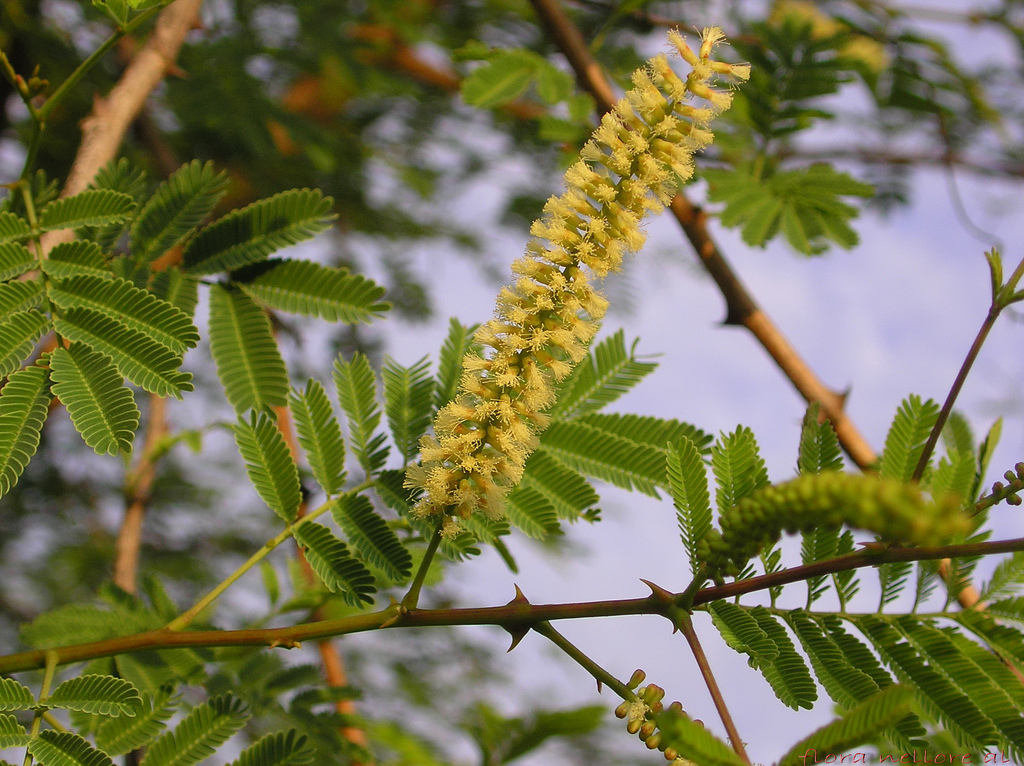

Scientific classification
- Kingdom: Plantae
- Clade: Tracheophytes
- Clade: Angiosperms
- Clade: Eudicots
- Clade: Rosids
- Order: Fabales
- Family: Fabaceae
- Subfamily: Caesalpinioideae
- Clade: Mimosoid clade
- Genus: Senegalia
- Species: S. chundra

Binomial name
- Senegalia chundra (Roxb. ex Rottler) Maslin
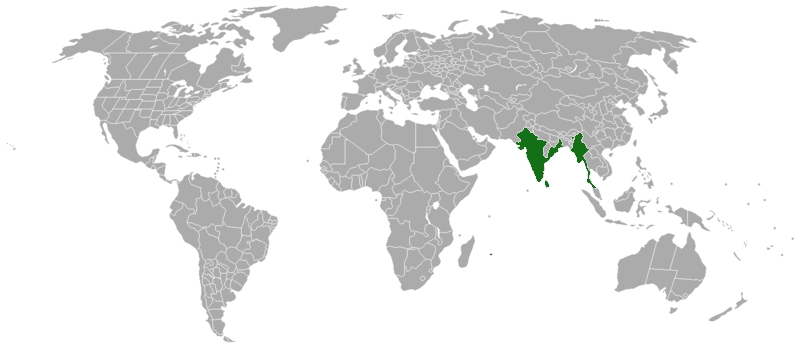
- Range of Senegalia chundra

Synonyms
- Acacia catechu (Rottler) Willd.; Acacia catechu auct. non Willd.; Acacia catechu (L.f.) Willd. var. sundra (Roxb.) Prain; Acacia sundra (Roxb.) DC.; Mimosa chundra Rottler

= Senegalia chundra =

Species of legume

Senegalia chundra is a perennial, deciduous tree found in Asia, India and in the Indian Ocean area. It grows 12 to 15 metres in height.

Common names for it include karangali, kodalimurunkai, lal khair, lal khair, rat kihiriya and red cutch.

Its uses include chemical and wood products.

== Uses ==
The wood is used for certain applications in shipbuilding. The tree is used for timber, for cutch (catechutannic acid) from its wood and for tannin. It is also used as food for bees. It is a preferred nesting site for the scaly-breasted munia.

Kheersal is found as a white substance in the tree's wood. Cutch is sought after commercially as a dye and to preserve fabrics from weather, mildew and marine exposure.

== Conservation ==
Senegalia chundra is considered "moderately threatened". In India it is now necessary to get a permit before cutting this tree down.
