= Senegalia ankokib =

Conservation status
- Vulnerable (IUCN 3.1)

Scientific classification
- Kingdom: Plantae
- Clade: Tracheophytes
- Clade: Angiosperms
- Clade: Eudicots
- Clade: Rosids
- Order: Fabales
- Family: Fabaceae
- Subfamily: Caesalpinioideae
- Clade: Mimosoid clade
- Genus: Senegalia
- Species: S. ankokib

Binomial name
- Senegalia ankokib (Chiov.) Kyal. & Boatwr.

Synonyms
- Acacia ankokib Chiov.

Species of legume

Senegalia ankokib is a species of plant in the family Fabaceae. It is found only in Somalia.
