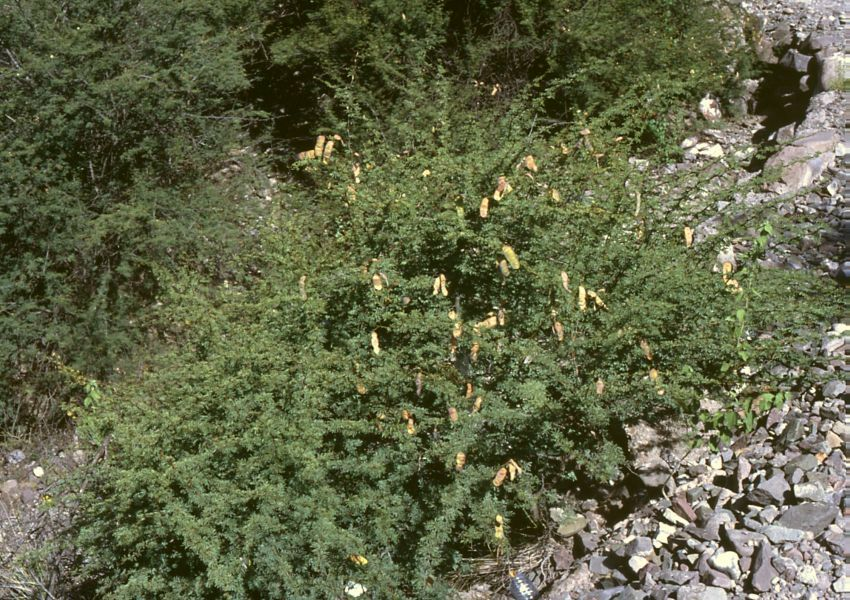

Conservation status
- Least Concern (IUCN 3.1)

Scientific classification
- Kingdom: Plantae
- Clade: Tracheophytes
- Clade: Angiosperms
- Clade: Eudicots
- Clade: Rosids
- Order: Fabales
- Family: Fabaceae
- Subfamily: Caesalpinioideae
- Clade: Mimosoid clade
- Genus: Senegalia
- Species: S. gilliesii

Binomial name
- Senegalia gilliesii (Steud.) Seigler & Ebinger, 2006

Synonyms
- List: Acacia furcata, Hook. & Arn. (1833); Acacia furcatispina, Burkart (1947); Acacia gilliesii, Steud. (1840); Manganaroa furcata (Hook. & Arn.) Speg. (1923)

= Senegalia gilliesii =

Species of legume

Senegalia gilliesii is a species of plant in the family Fabaceae. It is found in Argentina, Bolivia, Paraguay, and Uruguay.

== Description ==
This tree or large bush typically grows up to 5 meters (16 feet) high. It tends to drop its leaves slowly during cold periods or drought, but not all at once. The bark is gray and develops cracks and grooves on the older, thicker trunks. At every joint, there is a spur that ends in two sharp, curved thorns that point backwards. The leaves are divided twice giving them a fine, feathery look. Small white flowers bloom in the summer, and are grouped tightly together in round, head-like clusters.

== Taxonomy ==
The plant was originally described by John Gillies, but the publication was completed by William Jackson Hooker and George Arnott Walker Arnott in the work Botanical miscellany after Gillies death.

== Distribution ==
It occurs in regions of northern Argentina, Bolivia, Paraguay, and Uruguay and is commonly found around slopes and plains in dry scrub, savanna, and subtropical woodlands.
