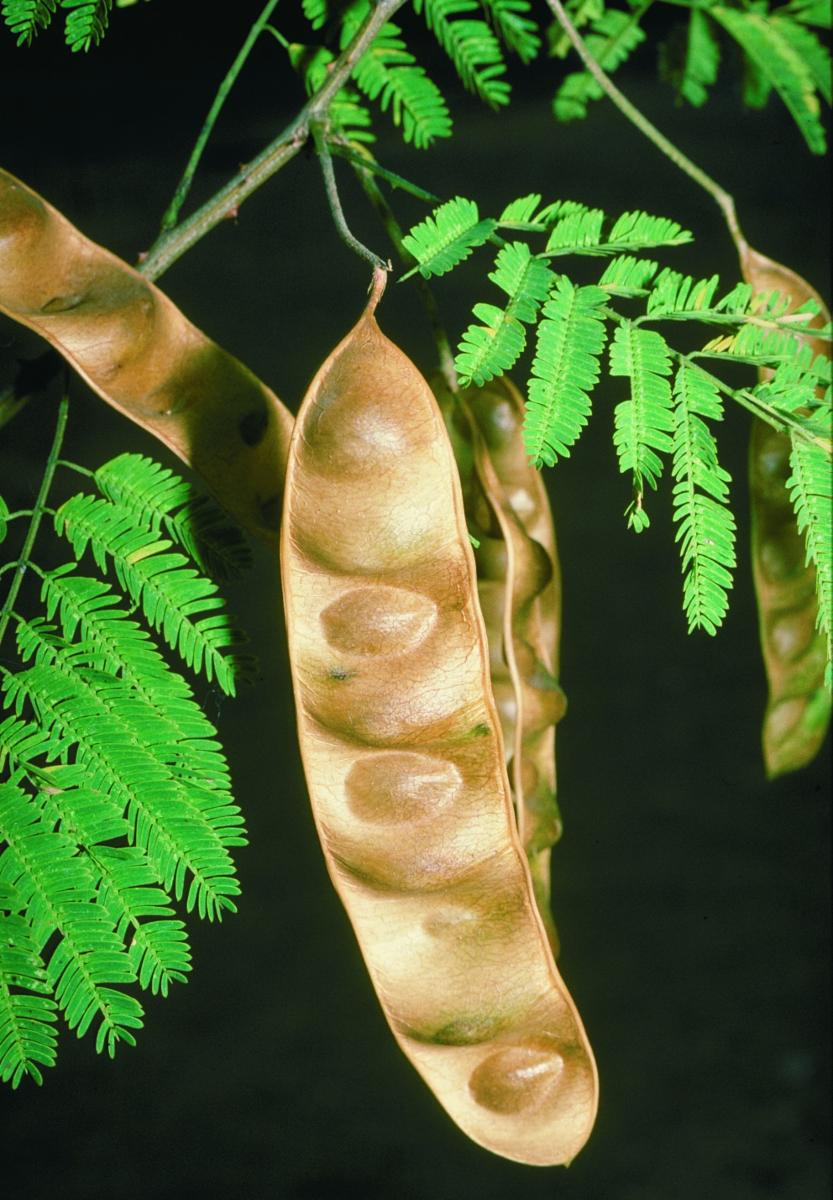

Conservation status
- Least Concern (IUCN 3.1)

Scientific classification
- Kingdom: Plantae
- Clade: Tracheophytes
- Clade: Angiosperms
- Clade: Eudicots
- Clade: Rosids
- Order: Fabales
- Family: Fabaceae
- Subfamily: Caesalpinioideae
- Clade: Mimosoid clade
- Genus: Senegalia
- Species: S. riparia

Binomial name
- Senegalia riparia (Kunth) Britton & Rose

Synonyms
- Acacia retusa (Jacq.) R.A. Howard; Acacia riparia Kunth; Acacia westiana DC.; Senegalia westiana (DC.) Britton & Rose

= Senegalia riparia =

Species of plant

Senegalia riparia, commonly known as catch & keep, calumbi, jurema-branca, acacia zarza, amourette, and fleur du ben-aimé, is a thorny flowering plant of the family Fabaceae. It is native to Hispaniola, Puerto Rico, the Virgin Islands, the Lesser Antilles,Trinidad, and northern South America (as far as western Bolivia).
