= Senegalia sakalava =

Scientific classification
- Kingdom: Plantae
- Clade: Tracheophytes
- Clade: Angiosperms
- Clade: Eudicots
- Clade: Rosids
- Order: Fabales
- Family: Fabaceae
- Subfamily: Caesalpinioideae
- Clade: Mimosoid clade
- Genus: Senegalia
- Species: S. sakalava

Binomial name
- Senegalia sakalava (Drake) Boatwr. 2015

Synonyms
- Acacia drakei R. Vig; Acacia sakalava Drake

Species of legume

Senegalia sakalava is a species of Senegalia that is endemic to Madagascar. Two varieties are recognised:

- Senegalia sakalava var. hispida Villiers & Du Puy
- Senegalia sakalava var. sakalava

The species occurs in the provinces of Fianarantsoa, Mahajanga, and Toliara.
