= Senegalia pervillei =

Scientific classification
- Kingdom: Plantae
- Clade: Tracheophytes
- Clade: Angiosperms
- Clade: Eudicots
- Clade: Rosids
- Order: Fabales
- Family: Fabaceae
- Subfamily: Caesalpinioideae
- Clade: Mimosoid clade
- Genus: Senegalia
- Species: S. pervillei

Binomial name
- Senegalia pervillei (Benth.) Boatwr. 2015

Synonyms
- Acacia pervillei Benth.

Species of legume

Senegalia pervillei is a species of Senegalia that is endemic to Madagascar. The species was first formally described by English botanist George Bentham in 1875 in Transactions of the Linnean Society of London. Two varieties are recognised:

- Senegalia pervillei var. pervillei
- Senegalia pervillei var. pubescens Villiers & Du Puy

It occurs in dry grassland, woodland and forest areas of the provinces of Antsiranana, Mahajanga, and Toliara.
