= Senegalia angustifolia =

Scientific classification
- Kingdom: Plantae
- Clade: Tracheophytes
- Clade: Angiosperms
- Clade: Eudicots
- Clade: Rosids
- Order: Fabales
- Family: Fabaceae
- Subfamily: Caesalpinioideae
- Clade: Mimosoid clade
- Genus: Senegalia
- Species: S. angustifolia

Binomial name
- Senegalia angustifolia (Lam.) Britton & Rose

Synonyms
- Acacia skleroxyla Tussac; Mimosa angustifolia Lam.; Mimosa tenuifolia Descourtilz

Species of legume

Senegalia angustifolia is a species of plant in the family Fabaceae.
