= List of compounds with carbon number 15 =

This is a partial list of molecules that contain 15 carbon atoms.

Chemical formula	Synonyms	CAS number
C_{15}F_{33}N	perfluorotripentylamine	338-84-1
C_{15}H_{8}O_{5}	Coumestrol	479-13-0
C_{15}H_{8}O_{6}	Rhein	478-43-3
C_{15}H_{10}BrClN_{4}S	brotizolam	57801-81-7
C_{15}H_{10}ClFN_{2}O	desalkylflurazepam	2886-65-9
C_{15}H_{10}ClN_{3}O_{3}	clonazepam	1622-61-3
C_{15}H_{10}Cl_{2}N_{2}O	delorazepam	2894-67-9
C_{15}H_{10}Cl_{2}N_{2}O_{2}	lorazepam	846-49-1
C_{15}H_{10}FN_{3}O_{3}	desmethylflunitrazepam	2558-30-7
C_{15}H_{10}N_{2}O_{2}	methylene diphenyl diisocyanate	26447-40-5
C_{15}H_{10}O_{2}	Aurone	582-04-7
C_{15}H_{10}O_{2}	Flavone	
C_{15}H_{10}O_{2}	Isoflavonoid	
C_{15}H_{10}O_{2}	Phenindione	83-12-5
C_{15}H_{10}O_{3}	6-hydroxyflavone	6665-83-4
C_{15}H_{10}O_{4}	Chrysin	– 480-40-0
C_{15}H_{10}O_{4}	Daidzein	– 486-66-8
C_{15}H_{10}O_{4}	Coumestrol	– 479-13-0
C_{15}H_{10}O_{5}	Fisetinidin	– 2948-76-7
C_{15}H_{10}O_{5}	Luteolinidin	– 1154-78-5
C_{15}H_{10}O_{5}	Pelargonidin	– 134-04-3
C_{15}H_{10}O_{6}	Apigenin	– 520-36-5
C_{15}H_{10}O_{6}	Aloe emodin	481-72-1
C_{15}H_{10}O_{6}	Baicalein	491-67-8
C_{15}H_{10}O_{6}	Emodin	518-82-1
C_{15}H_{10}O_{6}	Galangin	548-83-4
C_{15}H_{10}O_{6}	Genistein	446-72-0
C_{15}H_{10}O_{6}	Morindone	478-29-5
C_{15}H_{10}O_{6}	Thunberginol A	147666-80-6
C_{15}H_{10}O_{6}	Thunberginol F	147666-82-8
C_{15}H_{10}O_{7}	Several molecules	–
C_{15}H_{10}O_{8}	Several molecules	–
C_{15}H_{11}ClF_{3}NO_{4}	oxyfluorfen	42874-03-3
C_{15}H_{11}ClN_{2}O	mecloqualone	340-57-8
C_{15}H_{11}ClN_{2}O	nordazepam	1088-11-5
C_{15}H_{11}ClN_{2}O_{2}	demoxepam	963-39-3
C_{15}H_{11}ClN_{2}O_{2}	oxazepam	604-75-1
C_{15}H_{11}N_{3}O_{3}	nitrazepam	146-22-5
C_{15}H_{11}O_{4}	Apigeninidin	–
C_{15}H_{11}O_{4}	Guibourtinidin	–
C_{15}H_{11}O_{5}	Several molecules	–
C_{15}H_{11}O_{6}	Several molecules	–
C_{15}H_{11}O_{7}	Delphinidin	13270-61-6
C_{15}H_{12}ClN_{3}O	desmethylchlordiazepoxide	7722-15-8
C_{15}H_{12}F_{9}FeO_{6}	ferric trifluoroacetylacetonate	14526-22-8
C_{15}H_{12}N_{2}O	carbamazepine	298-46-4
C_{15}H_{12}N_{2}O	tegretol	51-52-5
C_{15}H_{12}O	benzalacetophenone	614-47-1
C_{15}H_{12}O_{5}	Several molecules	–
C_{15}H_{12}O_{6}	Several molecules	–
C_{15}H_{12}O_{7}	Several molecules	–
C_{15}H_{12}O_{8}	Several molecules	–
C_{15}H_{13}N_{3}O_{4}S	piroxicam	36322-90-4
C_{15}H_{14}ClN_{3}O_{4}S_{3}	benzthiazide	91-33-8
C_{15}H_{14}N_{2}O_{2}	malonanilide	621-10-3
C_{15}H_{14}O	Several molecules	–
C_{15}H_{14}O_{2}	methyl diphenylacetate	3469-00-9
C_{15}H_{14}O_{3}	dibenzyl carbonate	3459-92-5
C_{15}H_{14}O_{3}	fenoprofen	31879-05-7
C_{15}H_{14}O_{3}	methyl benzilate	76-89-1
C_{15}H_{14}O_{3}	phenylethyl salicylate	87-22-9
C_{15}H_{14}O_{6}	Several molecules	–
C_{15}H_{15}BrN_{2}	nomelidine	60324-59-6
C_{15}H_{15}ClN_{2}O_{2}	chloroxuron	1982-47-4
C_{15}H_{15}NO	dibenzyl ketoxime	1788-31-4
C_{15}H_{15}NO	nordiphenamid	954-21-2
C_{15}H_{15}NO_{2}	mefenamic acid	61-68-7
C_{15}H_{15}NO_{3}	tolmetin	26171-23-3
C_{15}H_{15}OP	allyldiphenylphosphine oxide	4141-48-4
C_{15}H_{15}P	allyldiphenylphosphine	2741-38-0
C_{15}H_{15}Y	tricyclopentadienyl yttrium	1294-07-1
C_{15}H_{16}	ditolylmethane	1335-47-3
C_{15}H_{16}Cl_{3}N_{3}O_{2}	prochloraz	68444-81-5
C_{15}H_{16}N_{2}O_{2}	ancymidol	12771-68-5
C_{15}H_{16}O_{2}	benzophenone dimethyl ketal	2235-01-0
C_{15}H_{16}O_{3}	osthole	484-12-8
C_{15}H_{16}Si	methyldiphenylvinylsilane	13107-13-6
C_{15}H_{17}Br_{2}NO_{2}	bromoxynil octanoate	1689-99-2
C_{15}H_{17}Cl_{2}N_{3}O_{2}	propiconazole	75881-82-2
C_{15}H_{17}N	dibenzyl methyl amine	102-05-6
C_{15}H_{17}NO_{3}S	xyloxadine	60263-88-9
C_{15}H_{18}	tricyclopentabenzene	1206-79-7
C_{15}H_{18}Cl_{2}N_{2}O_{3}	oxadiazon	19666-30-9
C_{15}H_{19}MnO_{2}	cyclooctenecyclopentadienylmanganese dicarbonyl	49716-47-4
C_{15}H_{19}NO_{2}	bisnortilidine	53948-51-9
C_{15}H_{19}NS_{2}	ethylmethylthiambutene	441-61-2
C_{15}H_{20}N_{2}O	anagyrine	486-89-5
C_{15}H_{20}N_{2}O	rhombifoline	529-78-2
C_{15}H_{20}N_{2}O	thermopsine	486-90-8
C_{15}H_{20}N_{2}S	methaphenilene	493-78-7
C_{15}H_{20}O	curzerene	17910-09-7
C_{15}H_{20}O_{4}	butyl benzyl succinate	1223-37-6
C_{15}H_{20}O_{4}	ethylphenylmalonic acid diethyl ester	76-67-5
C_{15}H_{20}O_{4}	jesterone	
C_{15}H_{20}O_{6}	deoxynivalenol	51481-10-8
C_{15}H_{21}F_{3}N_{2}O_{2}	fluvoxamine	54739-18-3
C_{15}H_{21}MnO_{6}	manganic acetylacetonate	14284-89-0
C_{15}H_{21}N	fencamfamin	1209-98-9
C_{15}H_{21}NO	metazocine	3734-52-9
C_{15}H_{21}NO_{2}	benzamine	500-34-5
C_{15}H_{21}NO_{2}	ketobemidone	469-79-4
C_{15}H_{21}NO_{3}	hydroxypethidine	468-56-4
C_{15}H_{21}N_{3}O	primaquine	90-34-6
C_{15}H_{21}N_{3}O_{2}	physostigmine	57-47-6
C_{15}H_{21}N_{3}O_{3}	eseridine	25573-43-7
C_{15}H_{22}ClNO_{2}	metolachlor	51218-45-2
C_{15}H_{22}N_{2}O	carbocaine	96-88-8
C_{15}H_{22}N_{2}O	milnacipran	92623-85-3
C_{15}H_{22}N_{2}O_{3}	tolycaine	3686-58-6
C_{15}H_{22}O	aristolone	6831-17-0
C_{15}H_{22}O	curlone	87440-60-6
C_{15}H_{22}O	dendrolasin	23262-34-2
C_{15}H_{22}O	germacrone	6902-91-6
C_{15}H_{22}O	nootcatane	4674-50-4
C_{15}H_{22}O	solavetivone	54878-25-0
C_{15}H_{22}O	xanthorrhizol	30199-26-9
C_{15}H_{22}O	zerumbone	471-05-6
C_{15}H_{22}O_{2}	davana ether	35470-57-6
C_{15}H_{22}O_{2}	hexl dihydrocinnamate	220766-75-6
C_{15}H_{22}O_{2}	phenylethyl heptanoate	5454-11-5
C_{15}H_{22}O_{10}	arabitol pentaacetate	26674-23-7
C_{15}H_{22}O_{10}	Catalpol	2415-24-9
C_{15}H_{22}O_{10}	Xylitol pentacetate	13437-68-8
C_{15}H_{23}ClO_{4}S	aramite	140-57-8
C_{15}H_{23}N	prolintane	493-92-5
C_{15}H_{23}NO_{2}	alprenolol	13655-52-2
C_{15}H_{23}NO_{3}	oxprenolol	6452-71-7
C_{15}H_{23}NOS	esprocarb	85785-20-2
C_{15}H_{23}N_{3}O_{4}	isopropalin	33820-53-0
C_{15}H_{23}N_{3}O_{4}S	sulpiride	15676-16-1
C_{15}H_{24}	-chamigrene	18431-82-8
C_{15}H_{24}	acoradiene	24048-44-0
C_{15}H_{24}	aromadendrene	109119-91-7
C_{15}H_{24}	bicyclogermacrene	67650-90-2
C_{15}H_{24}	cedrene	11028-42-5
C_{15}H_{24}	clovene	469-92-1
C_{15}H_{24}	cyperene	2387-78-2
C_{15}H_{24}	elemene	11029-06-4
C_{15}H_{24}	eremophilene	10219-75-7
C_{15}H_{24}	germacrene a	28387-44-2
C_{15}H_{24}	germacrene b	15423-57-1
C_{15}H_{24}	longicyclene	1137-12-8
C_{15}H_{24}	patchoulene	1405-16-9
C_{15}H_{24}	seychellene	20085-93-2
C_{15}H_{24}	thujopsene	470-40-6
C_{15}H_{24}	viridiflorene	21747-46-6
C_{15}H_{24}N_{2}O	aphylline	577-37-7
C_{15}H_{24}N_{2}O	epiaphylline	1218-51-5
C_{15}H_{24}N_{2}O	lupanine	550-90-3
C_{15}H_{24}N_{2}O	trimecaine	616-68-2
C_{15}H_{24}N_{2}O_{2}	amethocaine	94-24-6
C_{15}H_{24}N_{2}O_{2}	hydroxylupanine	15358-48-2
C_{15}H_{24}N_{2}O_{4}S	tiapride	51012-32-9
C_{15}H_{24}O	butylated hydroxytoluene	128-37-0
C_{15}H_{24}O	cedranone	13567-40-3
C_{15}H_{24}O	cedrenol	28231-03-0
C_{15}H_{24}O	longifolenaldehyde	19890-84-7
C_{15}H_{24}O	nonyloxybenzene	36588-31-5
C_{15}H_{24}O	nonylphenol	25154-52-3
C_{15}H_{24}O	spathulenol	6750-60-3
C_{15}H_{24}O	vetivenol	68129-81-7
C_{15}H_{24}O_{2}	curdione	13657-68-6
C_{15}H_{24}O_{2}	davanone	20482-11-5
C_{15}H_{24}O_{2}	geranyl tiglate	7785-33-3
C_{15}H_{24}S	nonylphenyl sulfide	500041-11-2
C_{15}H_{25}NO_{3}	metoprolol	37350-58-6
C_{15}H_{25}NO_{3}Si_{2}	hippuric acid ditms	55133-85-2
C_{15}H_{25}NO_{4}	supinine	551-58-6
C_{15}H_{25}NO_{5}	echinatine	480-83-1
C_{15}H_{25}NO_{5}	indicine	480-82-0
C_{15}H_{25}NO_{5}	rinderine	6029-84-1
C_{15}H_{25}O_{3}P	dibutyl benzylphosphonate	3762-27-4
C_{15}H_{26}	cadinene	29350-73-0
C_{15}H_{26}	clovane	469-91-0
C_{15}H_{26}	patchoulane	25491-20-7
C_{15}H_{26}N_{2}	sparteine	90-39-1
C_{15}H_{26}N_{2}O	retamine	2122-29-4
C_{15}H_{26}O	agarospirol	1460-73-7
C_{15}H_{26}O	bulnesol	22451-73-6
C_{15}H_{26}O	carotol	465-28-1
C_{15}H_{26}O	cedrol	77-53-2
C_{15}H_{26}O	cubenol	21284-22-0
C_{15}H_{26}O	drimenol	19078-37-6
C_{15}H_{26}O	eudesmol	51317-08-9
C_{15}H_{26}O	globulol	51371-47-2
C_{15}H_{26}O	guaiol	489-86-1
C_{15}H_{26}O	hedycaryol	21657-90-9
C_{15}H_{26}O	himachalol	1891-45-8
C_{15}H_{26}O	hinesol	23811-08-7
C_{15}H_{26}O	juniper camphor	473-04-1
C_{15}H_{26}O	juniperol	465-24-7
C_{15}H_{26}O	ledol	577-27-5
C_{15}H_{26}O	levomenol	23089-26-1
C_{15}H_{26}O	patchouli alcohol	5986-55-0
C_{15}H_{26}O	valeranone	1803-39-0
C_{15}H_{26}O	viridiflorol	552-02-3
C_{15}H_{26}O	widdrol	6892-80-4
C_{15}H_{26}O_{2}	bisabolol oxide b	55399-12-7
C_{15}H_{26}O_{2}	citronellyl tiglate	24717-85-9
C_{15}H_{26}O_{2}	geranyl isovalerate	109-20-6
C_{15}H_{26}O_{2}	geranyl valerate	10402-47-8
C_{15}H_{26}O_{2}	linalyl valerate	10471-96-2
C_{15}H_{26}O_{4}	ethylene brassylate	105-95-3
C_{15}H_{26}O_{6}	tributyrin	60-01-5
C_{15}H_{27}Cl_{3}O_{2}	tridecyl trichloroacetate	74339-51-8
C_{15}H_{27}NO_{4}	trachelanthamine	14140-18-2
C_{15}H_{28}	amorphane	34315-85-0
C_{15}H_{28}	muurolane	29788-41-8
C_{15}H_{28}	selinane	30824-81-8
C_{15}H_{28}O	cyclopentadecanone	502-72-7
C_{15}H_{28}O	dihydrofarnesol	1335-48-4
C_{15}H_{28}O_{2}	citronellyl isovalerate	68922-10-1
C_{15}H_{28}O_{2}	citronellyl valerate	7540-53-6
C_{15}H_{28}O_{2}	dodecyl acrylate	2156-97-0
C_{15}H_{28}O_{2}	menthyl valerate	64129-94-8
C_{15}H_{28}O_{2}	pentadecanolide	32539-85-8
C_{15}H_{28}O_{4}	diethyl octylmalonate	1472-85-1
C_{15}H_{28}O_{4}	dodecylmalonic acid	4371-74-8
C_{15}H_{28}O_{4}	monodecyl glutarate	97526-58-4
C_{15}H_{29}ClO	pentadecanoyl chloride	17746-08-6
C_{15}H_{29}N	pentadecanenitrile	18300-91-9
C_{15}H_{29}NS	tetradecyl isothiocyanate	3224-48-4
C_{15}H_{30}	bisabolane	29799-19-7
C_{15}H_{30}	cyclopentadecane	295-48-7
C_{15}H_{30}O_{2}	ethyl tridecanoate	28267-29-0
C_{15}H_{30}O_{2}	heptyl caprylate	4265-97-8
C_{15}H_{30}O_{2}	isopropyl laurate	10233-13-3
C_{15}H_{30}O_{2}	pentadecanoic acid	1002-84-2
C_{15}H_{30}O_{2}	propyl laurate	3681-78-5
C_{15}H_{32}	pentadecane	629-62-9
C_{15}H_{32}O_{3}S	tetradecyl methanesulfonate	6222-16-8
C_{15}H_{32}O_{4}S	pentadecyl sulfuric acid	45247-34-5
C_{15}H_{32}O_{6}	pentapropylene glycol	21482-12-2
C_{15}H_{32}Sn	allyltributyltin	24850-33-7
C_{15}H_{33}N	methyltetradecylamine	29369-63-9
C_{15}H_{33}N	pentadecylamine	2570-26-5
C_{15}H_{33}O_{4}P	tripentyl phosphate	2528-38-3
C_{15}H_{35}NO_{2}Si_{2}	alanine ditbdms	92751-15-0

== See also ==
- Carbon number
- List of compounds with carbon number 14
- List of compounds with carbon number 16
