= C15H14O =

The molecular formula C_{15}H_{14}O may refer to:

- Diphenylacetone
  - 1,1-Diphenylacetone
  - Dibenzyl ketone
- Dihydrochalcone
- Flavan, a backbone of certain flavonoids
- Isoflavan, a backbone found in isoflavanes
- Neoflavan
