= Rosewood (disambiguation) =

Rosewood refers to a number of richly hued timbers. Rosewood may also refer to:

== Arts, entertainment, and media ==
- Rosewood (album), a 1978 album by jazz trumpeter Woody Shaw
- Rosewood (film), a 1997 film directed by John Singleton, about the 1923 Rosewood massacre
- Rosewood (TV series), an American television series

== Enterprises ==
- Rosewood Center, also known as Rosewood State Hospital, a state-run institution in Owings Mills, Maryland, for the mentally handicapped and mentally ill
- Rosewood Hotels & Resorts, a luxury hotel company based in Hong Kong and Los Angeles
- Rosewood Hotel Group, parent company of Rosewood Hotels & Resorts. Also owned New World and penta brands

== Plants and plant extracts ==
- African rosewood, several species
- Rosewood, a common name for shrubs of the genus Vauquelinia (these do not yield wood)
- Rosewood oil, a valuable essential oil, extracted from the wood of Aniba rosaeodora

== Geography ==
=== Australia ===
- Rosewood, Queensland, a town
- Rosewood, New South Wales, a village community in the south east part of the Riverina

=== Canada ===
- Rosewood, Saskatoon, a neighbourhood

=== United States ===
- Rosewood, California (disambiguation), multiple locations
- Rosewood, Florida, site of the Rosewood massacre
- Rosewood, Indiana
- Rosewood, Kentucky
- Rosewood Township, Chippewa County, Minnesota
- Rosewood, Minnesota
- Rosewood, Missouri
- Rosewood, North Carolina
- Rosewood, Ohio
- Rosewood, Wisconsin

=== Fictional places ===
- Rosewood, Pennsylvania, a fictional setting of the book and television series Pretty Little Liars
- Rosewood, a borough of the fictional Rockport City in the 2005 video game Need for Speed: Most Wanted

== Other uses ==
- Rosewood, a colour, one of the shades of red
- Rosewood massacre, a violent, racially motivated conflict that took place in 1923 in rural Levy County, Florida, United States

== See also ==
- Rosenholz files, or "rosewood files", a collection of files with information on employees of one of the intelligence agencies of the former GDR
