= C15H11O6 =

The molecular formula C_{15}H_{11}O_{6} (C_{15}H_{11}O_{6}+, molar mass: 287.24 g/mol, exact mass: 287.0555626 u) may refer to:

- Aurantinidin, an anthocyanidin
- Columnidin, an anthocyanidin
- Cyanidin, an anthocyanidin
- Robinetinidin, an anthocyanidin
- Tricetinidin, an anthocyanidin
