= C15H20O =

The molecular formula C_{15}H_{20}O (molar mass: 216.319 g/mol, exact mass: 216.1514 u) may refer to:

- Curzerene
- Hexyl cinnamaldehyde
- Mutisianthol
