= C15H10O6 =

The molecular formula C_{15}H_{10}O_{6} (molar mass : 286.23 g/mol, exact mass : 286.047738) may refer to:

- Asphodelin A, a coumarin
- Aureusidin, an aurone
- Catenarin, a naphthoquinone
- Citreorosein, a polyketide
- Fisetin, a flavonol
- Kaempferol, a flavonol
- Isoscutellarein, a tetrahydroxyflavone
- Lunatin, an anthraquinone
- Luteolin, a tetrahydroxyflavone
- Norartocarpetin, a tetrahydroxyflavone
- Orobol, an isoflavone
- Scutellarein, a tetrahydroxyflavone
- Thunberginol B, an isocoumarin
