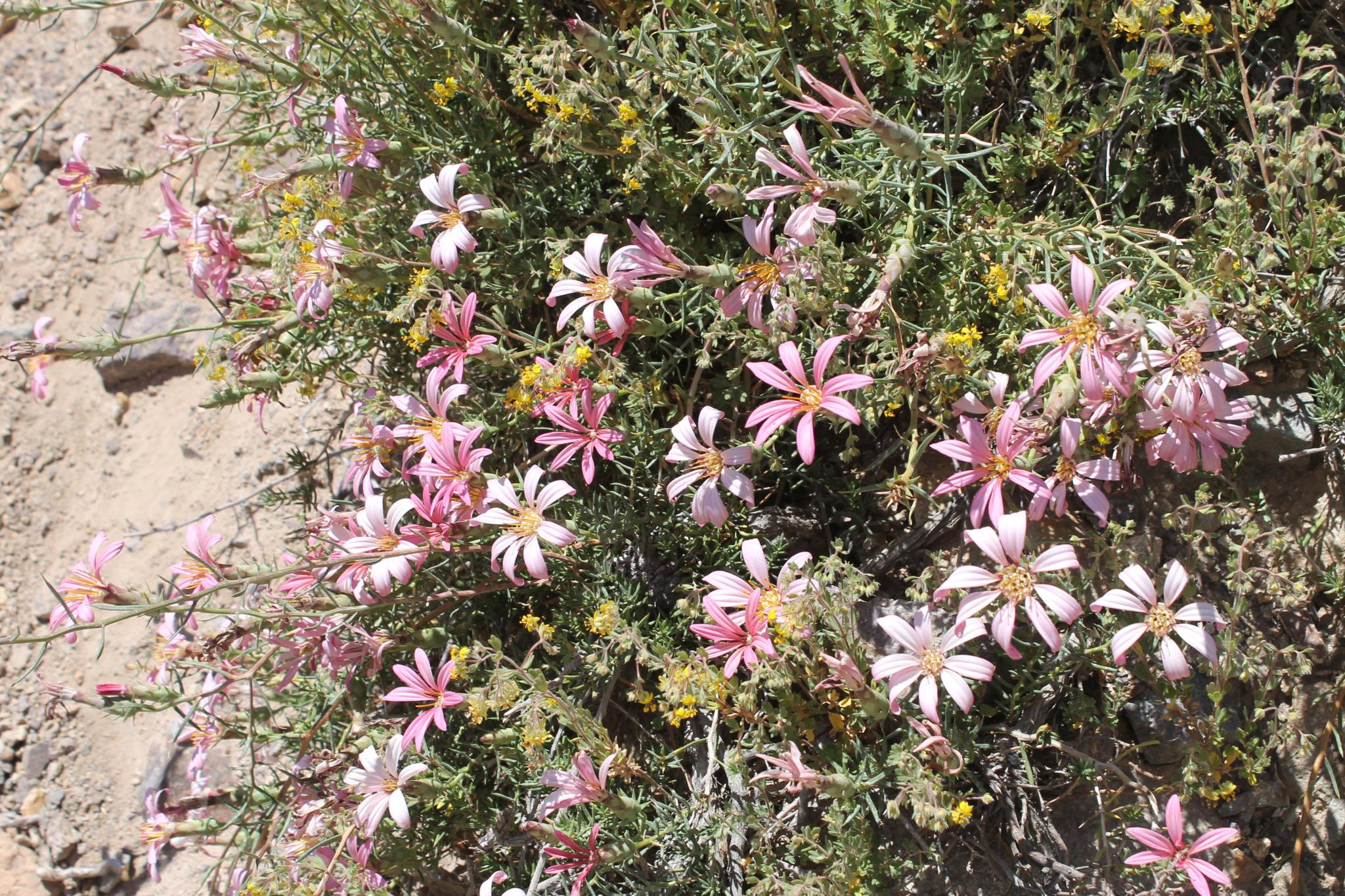
- Mutisia acerosa in Valparaíso Region, Chile.

Scientific classification
- Kingdom: Plantae
- Clade: Tracheophytes
- Clade: Angiosperms
- Clade: Eudicots
- Clade: Asterids
- Order: Asterales
- Family: Asteraceae
- Subfamily: Mutisioideae
- Tribe: Mutisieae
- Genus: Mutisia; L.f.

Synonyms
- Mutisia sect. Guariruma (Cass.) Cabrera; Guariruma Cass.; Aplophyllum Cass.

= Mutisia =

Genus of sunflowers

Mutisia is a genus of flowering plant in the tribe Mutisieae within the family Asteraceae. Mutisia has been named after José Celestino Mutis. It comprises about sixty species which can be found along the entire length of the Andes and in southern Brazil, Paraguay, Uruguay and northern Argentina.

Species accepted by the Plants of the World Online as of December 2022:

- Mutisia acerosa Poepp. ex Less.
- Mutisia acuminata Ruiz & Pav.
- Mutisia alata Hieron.
- Mutisia anderssonii Sodiro ex Hieron.
- Mutisia araucana Phil.
- Mutisia arequipensis Cabrera
- Mutisia brachyantha Phil.
- Mutisia burkartii Cabrera
- Mutisia campanulata Less.
- Mutisia cana Poepp. & Endl.
- Mutisia castellanosii Cabrera
- Mutisia clematis L.f.
- Mutisia coccinea A.St.-Hil.
- Mutisia cochabambensis Hieron.
- Mutisia comptoniifolia Rusby
- Mutisia decurrens Cav.
- Mutisia discoidea Harling
- Mutisia friesiana Cabrera
- Mutisia glabrata Cuatrec.
- Mutisia grandiflora Bonpl.
- Mutisia hamata Reiche
- Mutisia hastata Cav.
- Mutisia hieronymi Sodiro ex Cabrera
- Mutisia homoeantha Wedd.
- Mutisia ilicifolia Cav.
- Mutisia intermedia Hieron.
- Mutisia involucrata Phil.
- Mutisia kurtzii R.E.Fr.
- Mutisia lanata Ruiz & Pav.
- Mutisia lanigera Wedd.
- Mutisia latifolia D.Don
- Mutisia ledifolia Decne. ex Wedd.
- Mutisia lehmannii Hieron.
- Mutisia linearifolia Cav.
- Mutisia linifolia Hook.
- Mutisia lutzii G.M.Barroso
- Mutisia macrophylla Phil.
- Mutisia magnifica C.Ulloa & P.Jørg.
- Mutisia mandoniana Wedd. ex Cabrera
- Mutisia mathewsii Hook. & Arn.
- Mutisia microcephala Sodiro ex Cabrera
- Mutisia microneura Cuatrec.
- Mutisia microphylla Willd. ex DC.
- Mutisia ochroleuca Cuatrec.
- Mutisia oligodon Poepp. & Endl.
- Mutisia orbignyana Wedd.
- Mutisia pulcherrima Muschl.
- Mutisia rauhii Ferreyra
- Mutisia retrorsa Cav.
- Mutisia rimbachii Sodiro ex S.K.Harris
- Mutisia rosea Poepp. ex Less.
- Mutisia saltensis Cabrera
- Mutisia sinuata Cav.
- Mutisia sodiroi Hieron.
- Mutisia speciosa Aiton ex Hook.
- Mutisia spectabilis Phil.
- Mutisia spinosa Ruiz & Pav.
- Mutisia splendens Renjifo
- Mutisia stuebelii Hieron.
- Mutisia subspinosa Cav.
- Mutisia subulata Ruiz & Pav.
- Mutisia tridens Poepp. ex Less.
- Mutisia venusta S.F.Blake
- Mutisia vicia J.Kost.
- Mutisia wurdackii Cabrera

formerly included

see Gongylolepis

- Mutisia obovata - Gongylolepis martiana

== See also ==
- Mutisianthol
