= C15H14O6 =

The molecular formula C_{15}H_{14}O_{6} (molar mass: 290.26 g/mol, exact mass: 290.079038 u) may refer to:

- Catechin, a flavanol
- Citrinolactone A
- Leucofisetinidin, a leucoanthocyanidin
- Leucopelargonidin, a leucoanthocyanidin
- Luteoforol, a flavan-4ol
- Mesquitol, a flavanol
- Robinetinidol, a flavanol
