= 3-Deoxyanthocyanidin =

Class of chemical compounds

Anthocyanins chemical structure, carbon 3 is represented as the R3 group

Luteolinidin chemical structure

The 3-Deoxyanthocyanidins and their glycosides (3-deoxyanthocyanins or 3-DA) are molecules with an anthocyanidins backbone lacking an hydroxyl group at position 3 on the C-ring. This nomenclature is the inverse of that which is commonly used in flavonoids, where the hydroxy-group is assumed absent if it is not specified, e. g. flavan-3-ol, flavan-4-ol, flavan-3,4-ol and flavonol.

3-Deoxyanthocyanidins are yellow anthocyanidins that can be found primarily in ferns and mosses (Timberlake and Bridle, 1975, 1980), in Sorghum bicolor and in purple corn (Nakatani et al., 1979) (maíz morado).

3-Deoxyanthocyanidins are reported to be stable to color loss due to change in pH. Synthetic 3-deoxyanthocyanidins with a carboxylate group at carbon 4 show unusually stable colorant properties at pH 7.

In Sorghum, the SbF3'H2 gene, encoding a flavonoid 3'-hydroxylase, seems to be expressed in pathogen-specific 3-deoxyanthocyanidin phytoalexins synthesis, for example in Sorghum-Colletotrichum interactions.

This category include:

- Apigeninidin
- Columnidin
- Diosmetinidin
- Luteolinidin
- Tricetinidin
