= Tetrahydroxyflavone =

Tetrahydroxyflavone may refer to:

- Isoscutellarein (5,7,8,4'-Tetrahydroxyflavone)
- Luteolin (3',4',5,7-Tetrahydroxyflavone)
- Norartocarpetin (2',4',5,7-Tetrahydroxyflavone)
- Scutellarein (5,6,7,4'-Tetrahydroxyflavone)
