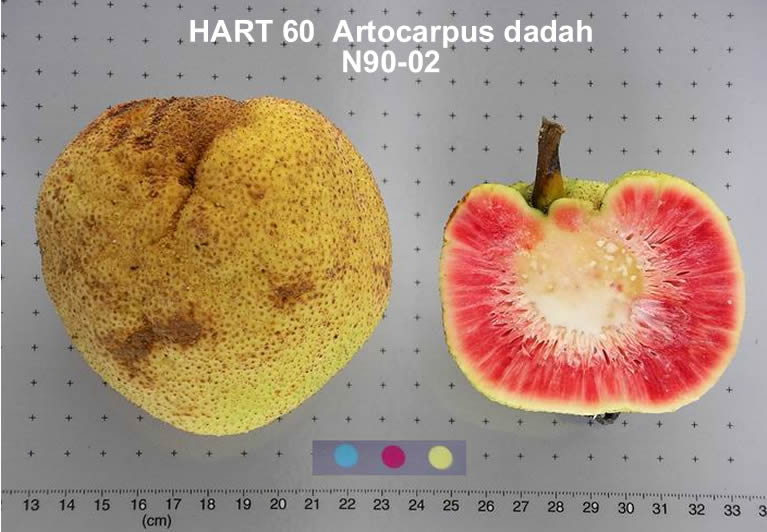
- Fruit

Conservation status
- Least Concern (IUCN 3.1)

Scientific classification
- Kingdom: Plantae
- Clade: Embryophytes
- Clade: Tracheophytes
- Clade: Angiosperms
- Clade: Eudicots
- Clade: Rosids
- Order: Rosales
- Family: Moraceae
- Genus: Artocarpus
- Species: A. dadah

Binomial name
- Artocarpus dadah Miq., 1861

Synonyms
- Artocarpus dadah var. pubescens Miq.; Artocarpus erythrocarpus Korth. ex Miq.; Artocarpus inconstantissimus (Miq.) Miq.; Artocarpus lakoocha var. malayanus King; Artocarpus mollis Miq.; Artocarpus peltatus Merr.; Artocarpus reniformis Becc.; Artocarpus rufa Miq.; Artocarpus rufescens Miq.; Artocarpus tampang Miq.; Ficus inconstantissima Miq.; Ficus tampang Miq.; Saccus mollis (Miq.) Kuntze; Saccus dadah (Miq.) Kuntze

= Artocarpus dadah =

Species of flowering plant

Artocarpus dadah is a species of flowering plant in the Mulberry family (Moraceae). It is a tree native to the Andaman Islands, Myanmar, Laos, Thailand, Peninsular Malaysia, Borneo, and Sumatra.

== Chemical composition ==
The chemical compounds oxyresveratrol, (+)-catechin, afzelechin-3-O-alpha-L-rhamnopyranoside, (−)-epiafzelechin, dihydromorin, epiafzelechin-(4beta→8)-epicatechin, dadahol A and dadahol B, resveratrol, steppogenin, moracin M, isogemichalcone B, gemichalcone B, norartocarpetin and engeletin can be found in A. dadah.
