= Proguibourtinidin =

A Proguibourtinidin is a type of condensed tannins formed from guibourtinidol (leucoguibourtinidin). They yield guibourtinidin when depolymerized under oxidative conditions.

They can be found in Guibourtia coleosperma (the African rosewood) or in Cassia abbreviata.
