= C14H10O4 =

The molecular formula C_{14}H_{10}O_{4} (molar mass: 242.23 g/mol) may refer to:

- Benzoyl peroxide
- Diphenic acid
- Diphenyl oxalate
- Moracin M
