= C15H11O5 =

The molecular formula C_{15}H_{11}O_{5} (or C_{15}H_{11}O_{5}^{+}, molar mass: 271.24 g/mol, exact mass: 271.0606 u) may refer to:

- Fisetinidin, an anthocyanidin
- Luteolinidin, an anthocyanidin
- Pelargonidin, an anthocyanidin
