= C15H17NO3S =

The molecular formula C_{15}H_{17}NO_{3}S (molar mass: 291.37 g/mol) may refer to:

- d5SICS
- Xyloxadine
