= C15H12O6 =

The chemical formula C_{15}H_{12}O_{6} (molar mass : 288.25 g/mol, exact mass : 288.063388) may refer to:

- Aromadedrin, a flavanonol
- Dehydroaltenusin, a polyphenol
- Eriodictyol, flavanone
- Fustin, a flavanonol
- Okanin, a chalcone
- Thunberginol D, an isocoumarin
