= Fisetinidin =

Fisetinidin chloride

Names
- IUPAC name 2-(3,4-dihydroxyphenyl)chromenylium-3,7-diol chloride
- Other names Fisetinidin chloride 3,3',4',7-Tetrahydroxyflavylium chloride

Identifiers
CAS Number	2948-76-7
3D model (JSmol)	Interactive image
ChemSpider	16498776
PubChem CID	16212782
UNII	MF2RUJ9T8H
CompTox Dashboard (EPA)	DTXSID50583696
- InChI: InChI=1S/C15H10O5.ClH/c16-10-3-1-8-5-13(19)15(20-14(8)7-10)9-2-4-11(17)12(18)6-9;/h1-7H,(H3-,16,17,18,19);1H Key: GLSBVYMMIPVYDC-UHFFFAOYSA-N; InChI=1/C15H10O5.ClH/c16-10-3-1-8-5-13(19)15(20-14(8)7-10)9-2-4-11(17)12(18)6-9;/h1-7H,(H3-,16,17,18,19);1H Key: GLSBVYMMIPVYDC-UHFFFAOYAZ
- SMILES: C1=CC(=CC2=[O+]C(=C(C=C21)O)C3=CC(=C(C=C3)O)O)O.[Cl-]

Properties
Chemical formula	C_{15}H_{11}O_{5}+ (Cl^{−})
Molar mass	306.69 g/mol
- Except where otherwise noted, data are given for materials in their standard state (at 25 °C [77 °F], 100 kPa). verify (what is ?) Infobox references

Fisetinidin is an anthocyanidin. It has been obtained from the heartwood of Acacia mearnsii, from the bark of Rhizophora apiculata and can also be synthesized. Fisetinidin is very similar in structure to fisetin, which itself differs in structure from quercetin only by an additional hydroxyl group on the latter.

An assay of twenty flavonoids showed fisetinidin to be the least effective in inhibition of CD38 enzyme.

== Tannins ==
Fisetinidin can compose tannins. The polymers are then called profisetinidin (Porter, 1992).

== See also ==
- Leuco-fisetinidin
- List of compounds with carbon number 15
