= Prorobinetidin =

Prorobinetidins are a type of condensed tannins formed from robinetinidol. They form robinetinidin when depolymerized under oxidative conditions.

Mimosa and quebracho tannins are, according to a comparative ^{13}C NMR study of polyflavonoids, found to be predominantly profisetinidin/prorobinetidin-type tannins.

Stryphnodendron adstringens ( the barbatimão), a species of legume found in Brazil, produces prorobinetinidins in its stem bark. These are robinetinidol-(4β → 8)-epigallocatechin, robinetinidol-(4α → 8)-epigallocatechin, robinetinidol-(4β → 8)-epigallocatechin 3-O-gallate, robinetinidol-(4α → 8)-epigallocatechin 3-O-gallate, robinetinidol-(4α → 6)-gallocatechin and robinetinidol-(4α → 6)-epigallocatechin, in addition to the tentatively characterized, robinetinidol [4β → 6(8)]-gallocatechin and robinetinidol-(4α → 8)-gallocatechin.
