= Robinetinidol =

- Chemical structure of (-)-robinetinidol

Names
- IUPAC name (2R,3S)-Flavan-3,3′,4′,5′,7-pentol
- Systematic IUPAC name 5-[(2R,3S)-3,7-Dihydroxy-3,4-dihydro-2H-1-benzopyran-2-yl]benzene-1,2,3-triol

Identifiers
CAS Number	528-56-3
3D model (JSmol)	Interactive image
ChEBI	CHEBI:68327
ChemSpider	24842500
PubChem CID	12314983
UNII	SV6RV56M8K
CompTox Dashboard (EPA)	DTXSID50487448
- InChI: InChI=1S/C15H14O6/c16-9-2-1-7-3-12(19)15(21-13(7)6-9)8-4-10(17)14(20)11(18)5-8/h1-2,4-6,12,15-20H,3H2/t12-,15+/m0/s1 Key: GMPPKSLKMRADRM-SWLSCSKDSA-N; InChI=1/C15H14O6/c16-9-2-1-7-3-12(19)15(21-13(7)6-9)8-4-10(17)14(20)11(18)5-8/h1-2,4-6,12,15-20H,3H2/t12-,15+/m0/s1 Key: GMPPKSLKMRADRM-SWLSCSKDBU
- SMILES: C1[C@@H]([C@H](OC2=C1C=CC(=C2)O)C3=CC(=C(C(=C3)O)O)O)O

Properties
Chemical formula	C_{15}H_{14}O_{6}
Molar mass	290.26 g/mol
- Except where otherwise noted, data are given for materials in their standard state (at 25 °C [77 °F], 100 kPa). verify (what is ?) Infobox references

Robinetinidol is a flavanol, a type of flavonoids.

Prorobinetinidins, flavanols oligomers containing robinetinidol, can be found in Stryphnodendron adstringens.

== See also ==
- Robinetinidin, the corresponding anthocyanidin
