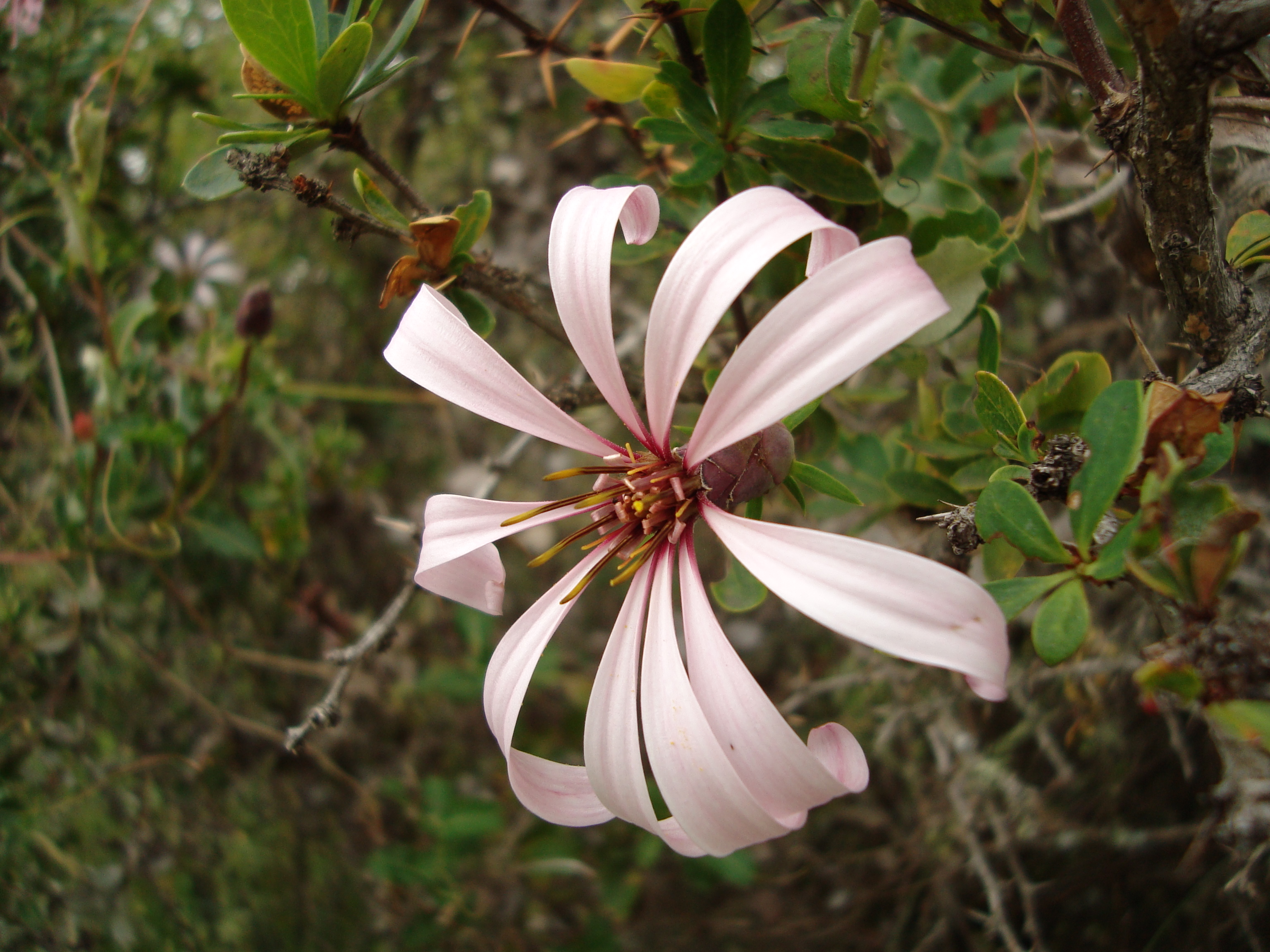

Scientific classification
- Kingdom: Plantae
- Clade: Tracheophytes
- Clade: Angiosperms
- Clade: Eudicots
- Clade: Asterids
- Order: Asterales
- Family: Asteraceae
- Genus: Mutisia
- Species: M. ilicifolia

Binomial name
- Mutisia ilicifolia Cav.

= Mutisia ilicifolia =

Species of flowering plant

Mutisia ilicifolia is a climbing vine in the daisy family (Compositae or Asteraceae) and native to Chile. Its leaves are unique in being holly-like but almost square, with a lengthy tendril at the end of each leaf. Each daisy head has eight pink ray florets.
