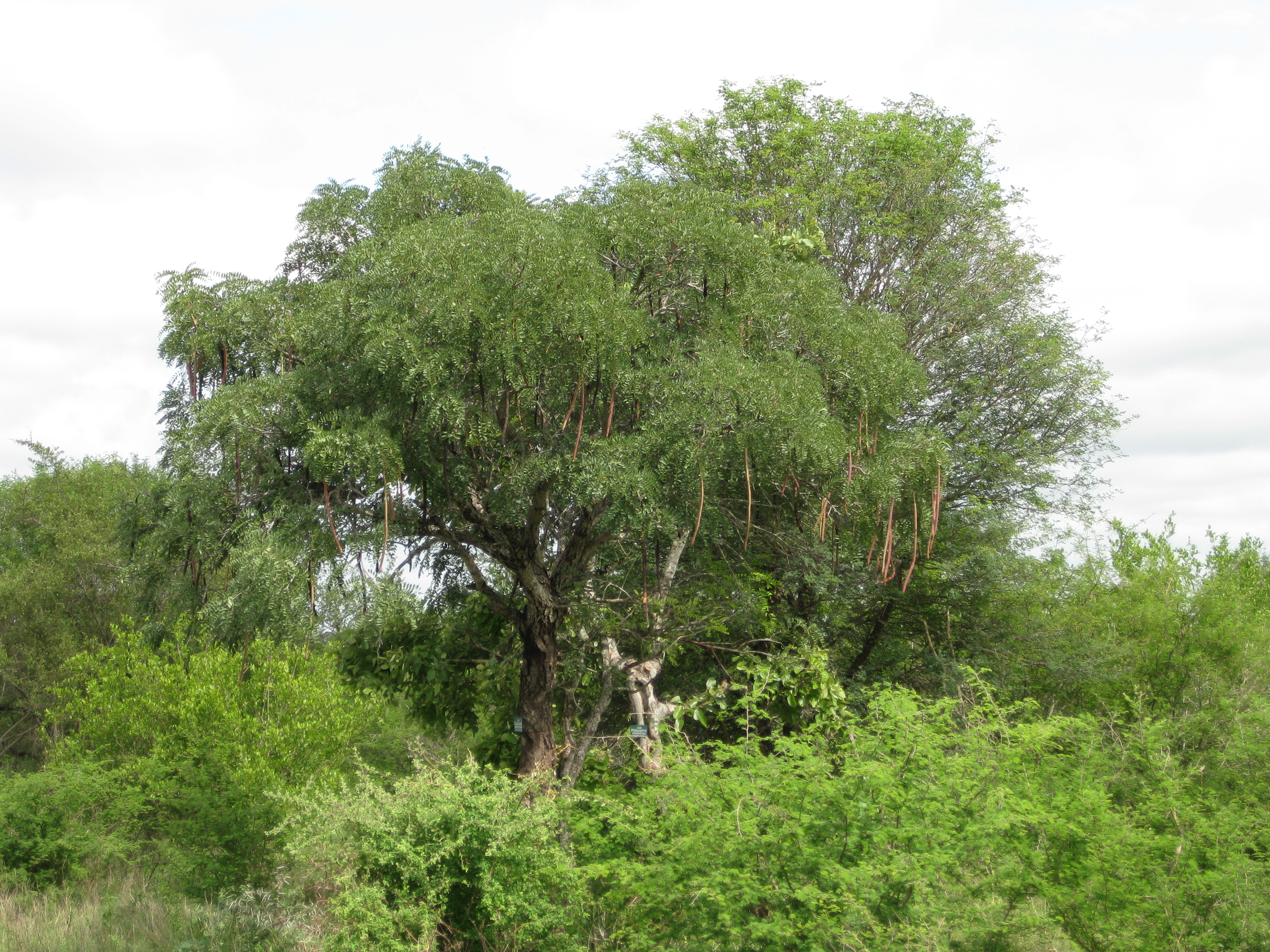

Scientific classification
- Kingdom: Plantae
- Clade: Embryophytes
- Clade: Tracheophytes
- Clade: Spermatophytes
- Clade: Angiosperms
- Clade: Eudicots
- Clade: Rosids
- Order: Fabales
- Family: Fabaceae
- Subfamily: Caesalpinioideae
- Genus: Cassia
- Species: C. abbreviata

Binomial name
- Cassia abbreviata Oliv.

Subspecies
- See text

= Cassia abbreviata =

Species of legume

Cassia abbreviata, commonly known as the sjambok pod or long-tail cassia, is a mostly tropical tree species in the genus Cassia, which is native to Africa.

== Native distribution ==
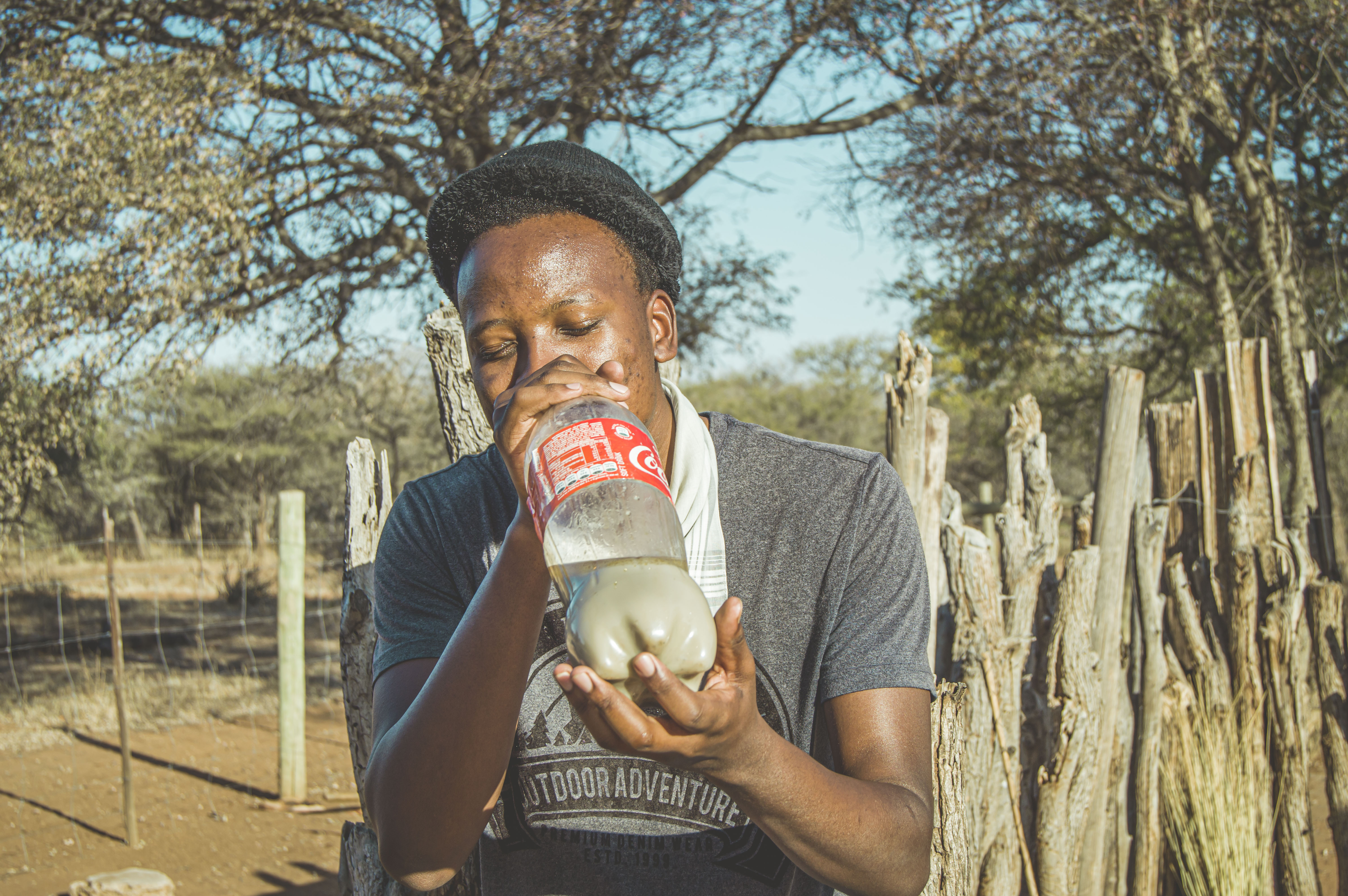
Drinking monepenepe in Botswana.

Cassia abbreviata is native to east, northeast, south, and west-central Africa; found in Botswana, the DRC, Kenya, Mozambique, Namibia, Somalia, South Africa (in the provinces of Limpopo and Mpumalanga), Eswatini, Tanzania, Zambia, and Zimbabwe.

== Uses ==
Proguibourtinidins, a type of condensed tannins, can be found in C. abbreviata and guibourtinidol, a flavan-3ol, can be found in its heartwood.

C. abbreviata is known as an important medicine plant in Botswana where it is called monepenepe.

== Subspecies ==
Three subspecies are distinguished on the basis of petal size, pubescence and geographical distribution:

- Cassia abbreviata subsp. abbreviata
- Cassia abbreviata subsp. beareana (Holmes) Brenan
- Cassia abbreviata subsp. kassneri (Baker f.) Brenan
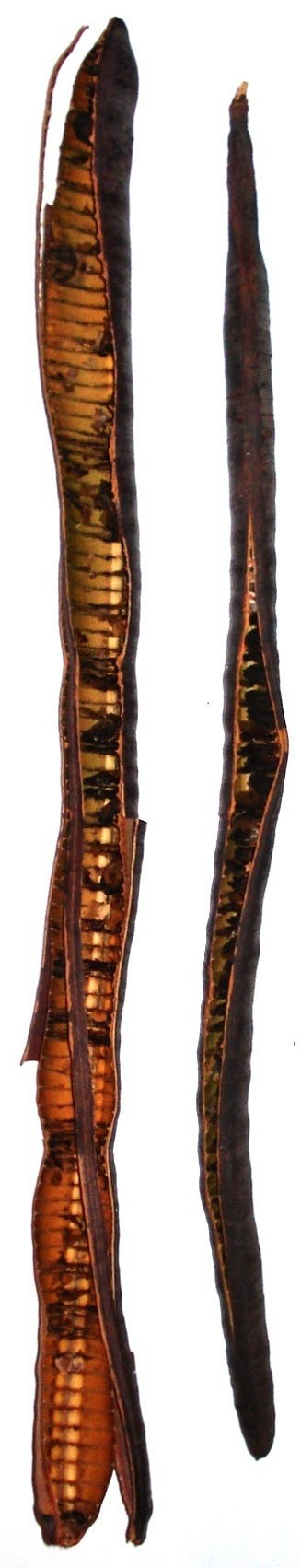
Dehisced seed pod

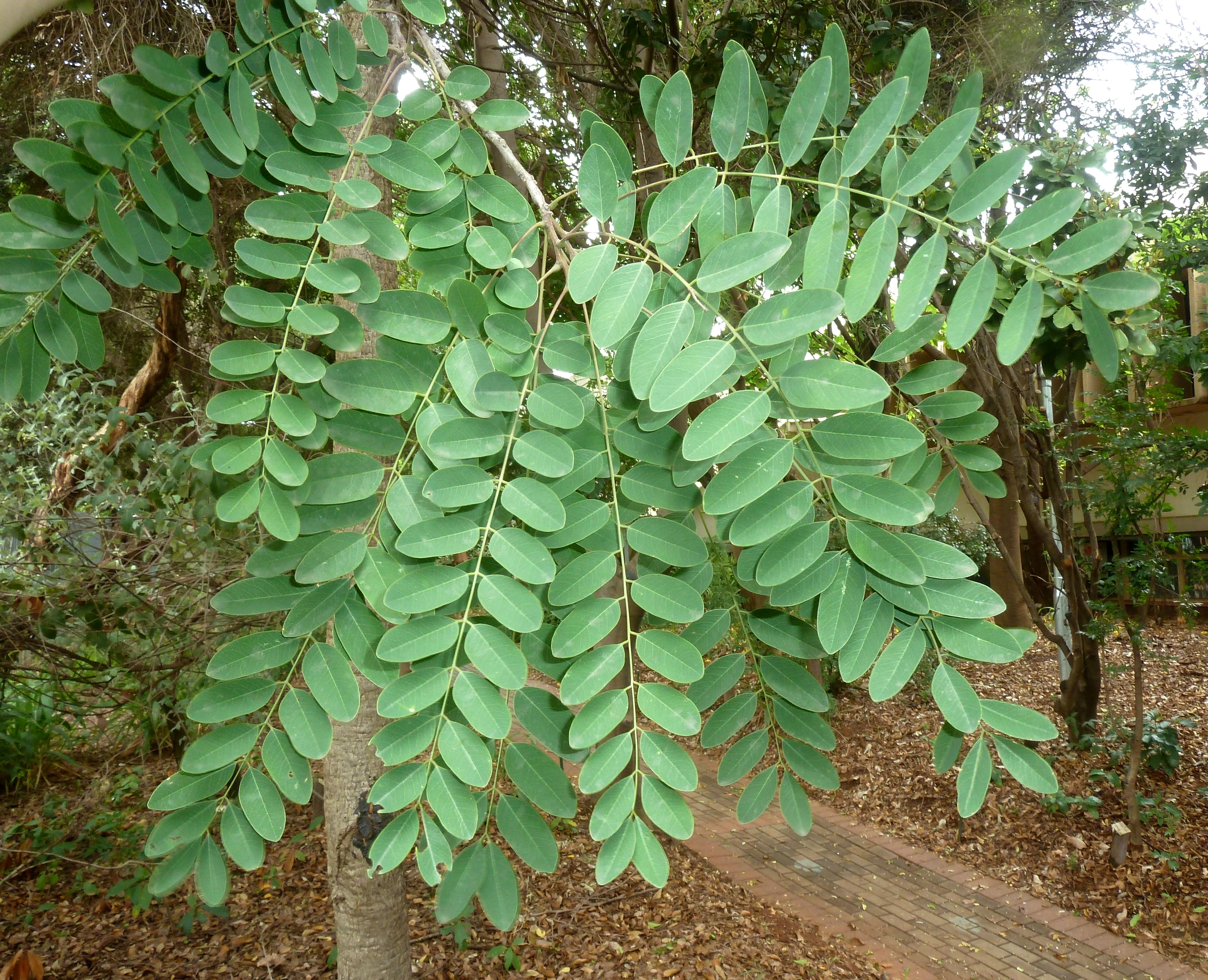
Foliage

== See also ==
- List of Southern African indigenous trees and woody lianes
