= Holcocera cerradicola =

Scientific classification
- Kingdom: Animalia
- Phylum: Arthropoda
- Clade: Pancrustacea
- Class: Insecta
- Order: Lepidoptera
- Family: Blastobasidae
- Genus: Holcocera
- Species: H. cerradicola

Binomial name
- Holcocera cerradicola Adamski & Ribeiro-Costa, 2008

Species of moth

Holcocera cerradicola is a moth in the family Blastobasidae. It is found in the Brazilian cerrado in Paraná.

The length of the forewings is 7.2–9.2 mm.

The larvae feed on the fruits of Bauhinia holophylla and Stryphnodendron adstringens.
