= Mutisia magnifica =

Conservation status
- Vulnerable (IUCN 3.1)

Scientific classification
- Kingdom: Plantae
- Clade: Tracheophytes
- Clade: Angiosperms
- Clade: Eudicots
- Clade: Asterids
- Order: Asterales
- Family: Asteraceae
- Genus: Mutisia
- Species: M. magnifica

Binomial name
- Mutisia magnifica C.Ulloa & P.Jørg.

Species of plant

Mutisia magnifica is a species of flowering plant in the family Asteraceae. It is found only in Loja province, Ecuador. Its natural habitat is subtropical or tropical moist montane forests. It is threatened by habitat loss.
