= C15H11O7 =

The molecular formula C_{15}H_{11}O_{7} (molar mass: 303.24 g/mol, exact mass: 303.050477 u) may refer to:

- 6-Hydroxycyanidin, an anthocyanidin
- Delphinidin, an anthocyanidin
