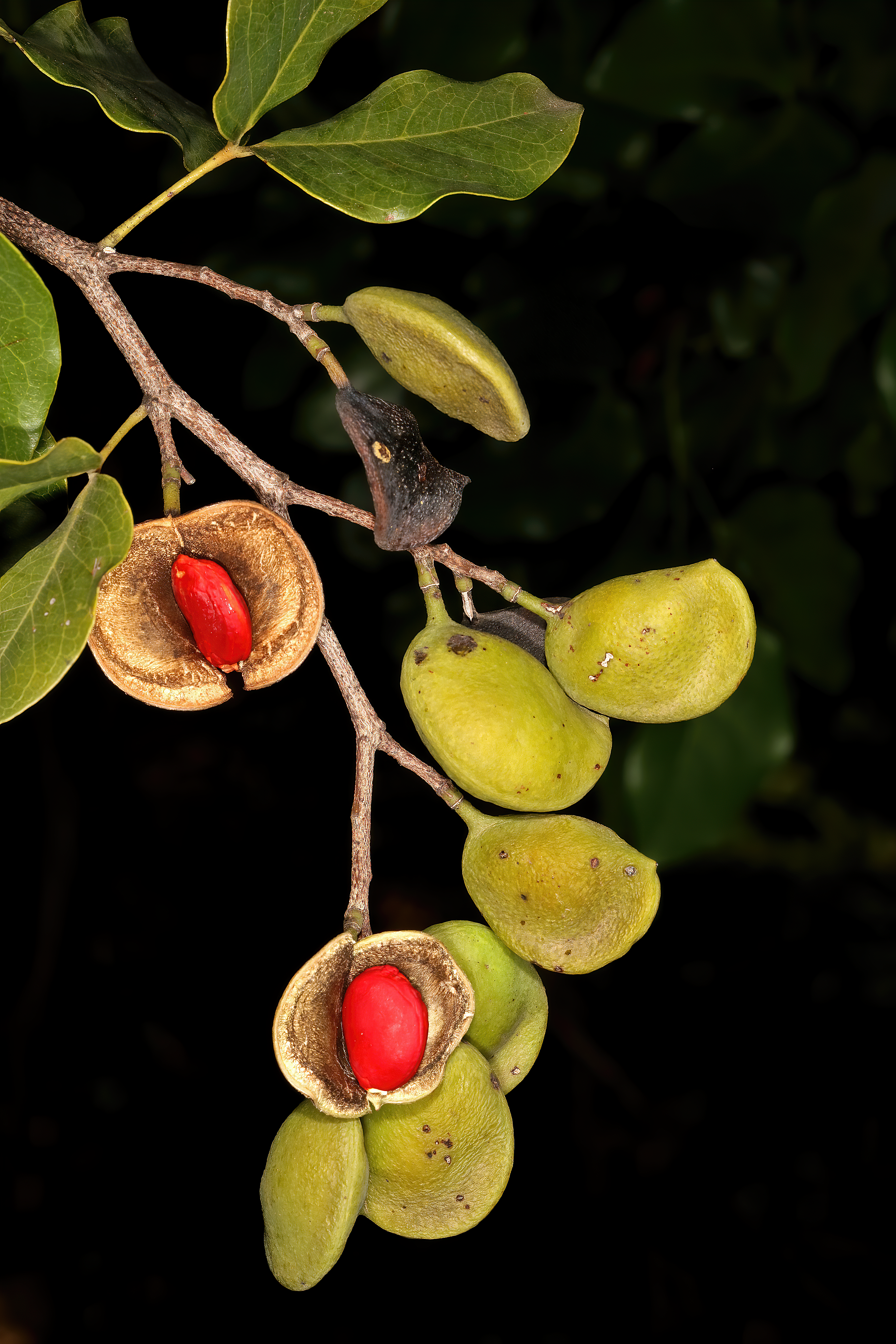

Scientific classification
- Kingdom: Plantae
- Clade: Tracheophytes
- Clade: Angiosperms
- Clade: Eudicots
- Clade: Rosids
- Order: Fabales
- Family: Fabaceae
- Genus: Guibourtia
- Species: G. coleosperma

Binomial name
- Guibourtia coleosperma (Benth.) J.Léonard

= Guibourtia coleosperma =

Species of legume

Guibourtia coleosperma, the African rosewood (ambiguous), large false mopane, Rhodesian copalwood or machibi, is a species of plant in the family Fabaceae. It is a large evergreen tree (to 20 m tall) found in open woodland and dry forest, almost exclusively on Kalahari Sand in Angola, southern Democratic Republic of Congo, Namibia, Botswana, Zambia, and Zimbabwe.

The condensed tannins proguibourtinidins can be found in G. coleosperma. G. coleosperma timber has a noticeable smell of menthol.

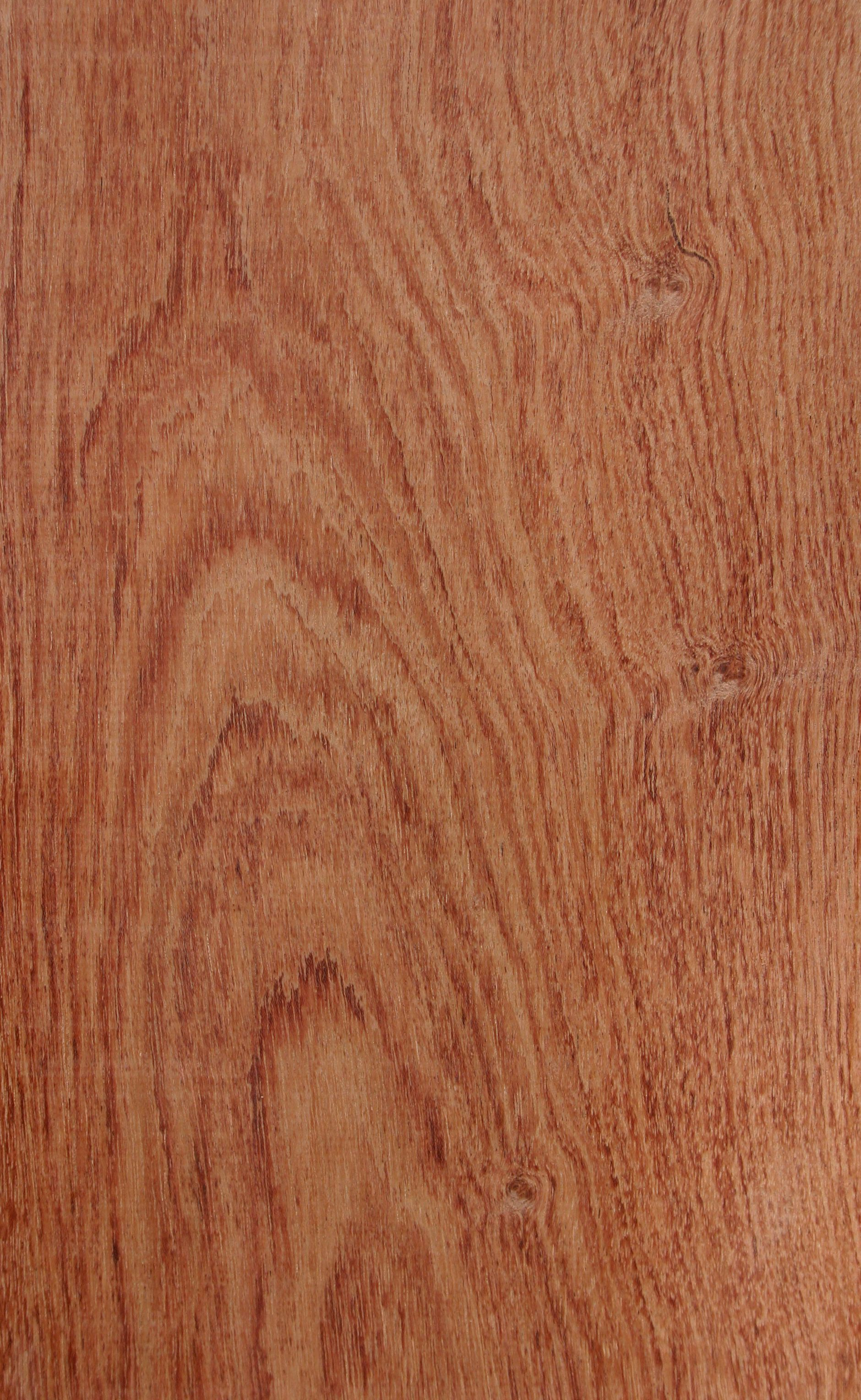
Guibourtia coleosperma timber

== See also ==
- List of Southern African indigenous trees and woody lianes
