= Robinetinidin =

- Chemical structure of robinetinidin

Names
- IUPAC name 5-(3,7-Dihydroxychromenylium-2-yl)benzene-1,2,3-triol chloride
- Other names 3,3',4',5',7-Pentahydroxyflavylium chloride

Identifiers
CAS Number	3020-09-5
3D model (JSmol)	Interactive image
ChemSpider	21489630
PubChem CID	16212723
UNII	DW6W3V57N8
CompTox Dashboard (EPA)	DTXSID80583684
- InChI: InChI=1S/C15H10O6/c16-9-2-1-7-3-12(19)15(21-13(7)6-9)8-4-10(17)14(20)11(18)5-8/h1-6H,(H4-,16,17,18,19,20)/p+1 Key: BQLHYJCUNNPCKQ-UHFFFAOYSA-O; InChI=1/C15H10O6/c16-9-2-1-7-3-12(19)15(21-13(7)6-9)8-4-10(17)14(20)11(18)5-8/h1-6H,(H4-,16,17,18,19,20)/p+1 Key: BQLHYJCUNNPCKQ-IKLDFBCSAA
- SMILES: C1=CC(=CC2=[O+]C(=C(C=C21)O)C3=CC(=C(C(=C3)O)O)O)O.[Cl-]

Properties
Chemical formula	C_{15}H_{11}ClO_{6} (C_{15}H_{11}O_{6}^{+}, Cl^{−})
Molar mass	322.69 g/mol
- Except where otherwise noted, data are given for materials in their standard state (at 25 °C [77 °F], 100 kPa). verify (what is ?) Infobox references

Robinetinidin is an anthocyanidin, a type of flavonoid.

Prorobinetinidins, condensed tannins oligomers containing robinetinidol, can be found in Stryphnodendron adstringens. They yield robinetinidin when depolymerized under oxidative conditions.

== See also ==
- Robinetinidol, the corresponding flavan-3ol
- Leucorobinetinidin, the corresponding leucoanthocyanidin
