= Diphenylacetone =

Diphenylacetone may refer to:

- 1,1-Diphenylacetone
- 1,3-Diphenylacetone (also known as dibenzyl ketone)
