= C15H11O4 =

The chemical compound C_{15}H_{11}O_{4} (or C_{15}H_{11}O_{4}^{+}, molar mass : 255.24 g/mol, exact mass: 255.065734) may refer to:

- Apigeninidin, an anthocyanidin
- Guibourtinidin, an anthocyanidin
