= Diosmetinidin =

Diosmetinidin (chloride)

Names
- IUPAC name 2-(3-hydroxy-4-methoxyphenyl)chromenylium-5,7-diol chloride
- Other names Diosmetinidin chloride 3',5,7-Trihydroxy-4'-methoxyflavylium chloride Diosmetinidine

Identifiers
CAS Number	64670-94-6
3D model (JSmol)	Interactive image
ChemSpider	21170251
PubChem CID	14842006
UNII	GL562AJ8JY
CompTox Dashboard (EPA)	DTXSID30564605
- InChI: InChI=1S/C16H12O5.ClH/c1-20-15-4-2-9(6-13(15)19)14-5-3-11-12(18)7-10(17)8-16(11)21-14;/h2-8H,1H3,(H2-,17,18,19);1H Key: OXTYCUBGMFGOAX-UHFFFAOYSA-N
- SMILES: COC1=C(C=C(C=C1)C2=[O+]C3=CC(=CC(=C3C=C2)O)O)O.[Cl-]

Properties
Chemical formula	C_{16}H_{13}O_{5}+ (Cl^{−})
Molar mass	320.72 g/mol
- Except where otherwise noted, data are given for materials in their standard state (at 25 °C [77 °F], 100 kPa). verify (what is ?) Infobox references

Diosmetinidin is a 3-deoxyanthocyanidin.
