= C15H12O7 =

The molecular formula C_{15}H_{12}O_{7} (molar mass: 304.25 g/mol, exact mass: 304.058303 u) may refer to:

- Dihydromorin, a flavanonol
- Taxifolin (epitaxifolin), a flavanonol
- Hydrorobinetin, a flavonoid
