= Asphodelin A =

Names
- IUPAC name 2′,4,4′,7-Tetrahydroxyisoflav-3-en-2-one
- Systematic IUPAC name 3-(2,4-Dihydroxyphenyl)-4,7-dihydroxy-2H-1-benzopyran-2-one

Identifiers
CAS Number	923570-49-4
3D model (JSmol)	Interactive image
ChEBI	CHEBI:65453
ChEMBL	ChEMBL268685
ChemSpider	23278396
PubChem CID	54679752
UNII	RC5JG5YKA4
CompTox Dashboard (EPA)	DTXSID60715668
- InChI: InChI=1S/C15H10O6/c16-7-1-3-9(11(18)5-7)13-14(19)10-4-2-8(17)6-12(10)21-15(13)20/h1-6,16-19H Key: OZOZCKVLUMXFGS-UHFFFAOYSA-N; InChI=1/C15H10O6/c16-7-1-3-9(11(18)5-7)13-14(19)10-4-2-8(17)6-12(10)21-15(13)20/h1-6,16-19H Key: OZOZCKVLUMXFGS-UHFFFAOYAL
- SMILES: C1=CC(=C(C=C1O)O)C2=C(C3=C(C=C(C=C3)O)OC2=O)O

Properties
Chemical formula	C_{15}H_{10}O_{6}
Molar mass	286.236
- Except where otherwise noted, data are given for materials in their standard state (at 25 °C [77 °F], 100 kPa). Infobox references

Asphodelin A is an antimicrobial arylcoumarin made by Asphodelus microcarpus.
