= Neoflavan =

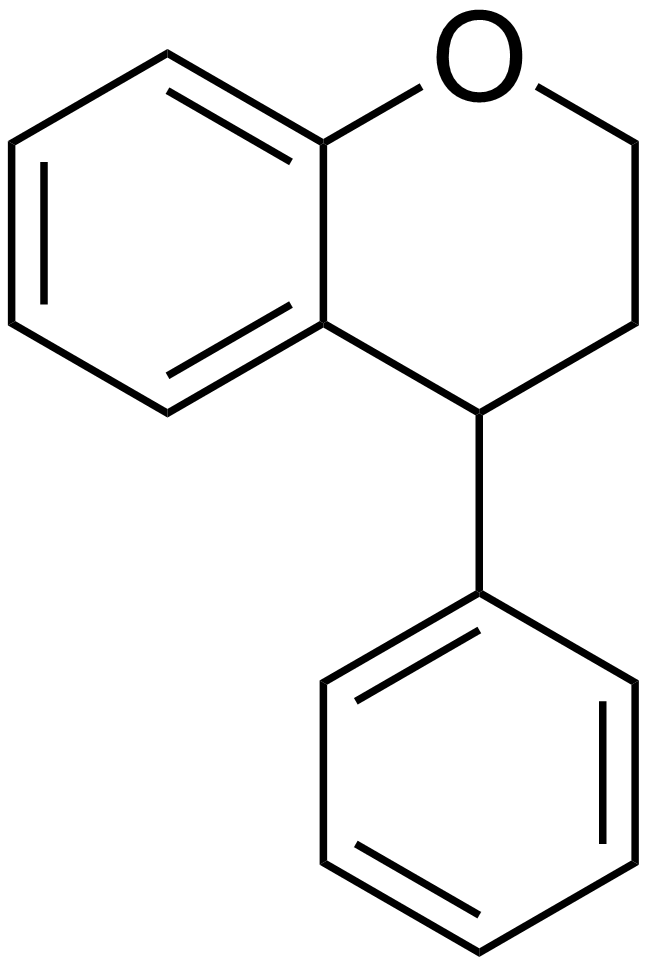

Names
- IUPAC name 4-Phenyl-3,4-dihydro-2H-chromene
- Other names 4-Phenylchroman; 3,4-Dihydro-4-phenyl-2H-1-benzopyran

Identifiers
CAS Number	21763-04-2
3D model (JSmol)	Interactive image
ChEBI	CHEBI:36099
ChemSpider	3052294
PubChem CID	3826106
CompTox Dashboard (EPA)	DTXSID60396951
- InChI: InChI=1S/C15H14O/c1-2-6-12(7-3-1)13-10-11-16-15-9-5-4-8-14(13)15/h1-9,13H,10-11H2
- SMILES: O3c1ccccc1C(c2ccccc2)CC3

Properties
Chemical formula	C_{15}H_{14}O
Molar mass	210.276 g·mol^{−1}
- Except where otherwise noted, data are given for materials in their standard state (at 25 °C [77 °F], 100 kPa). Infobox references

Neoflavan is a heterocyclic chemical compound that forms the central core of neoflavonoids.
