= African rosewood =

African rosewood is a common name for several plants and may refer to:

- Millettia laurentii, a legume tree from Africa and native to the Republic of Congo, the Democratic Republic of Congo, Cameroon, Gabon and Equatorial Guinea. The tree produces "wenge", a kind of wood.
- Species in the genus Guibourtia, including
  - Guibourtia coleosperma, a tree species found almost exclusively on Kalahari Sand in Angola, but also in nearby south-central African countries.
- Hagenia abyssinica, also known as East African Rosewood, is a species of flowering plant native to the high-elevation regions of central and eastern Africa.
Plants named African rosewood
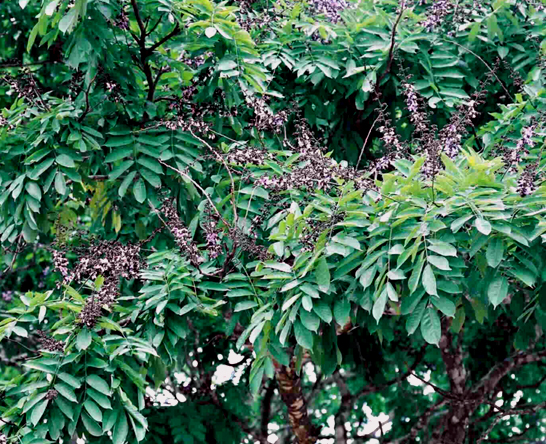
Millettia laurentii

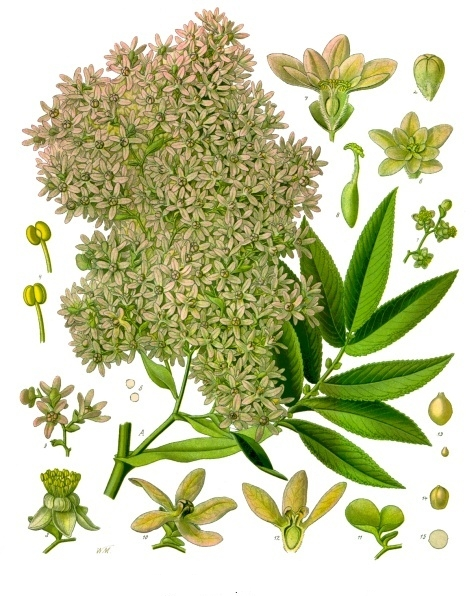
Hagenia abyssinica
