= Profisetinidin =

A profisetinidin is a type of condensed tannins formed from leuco-fisetinidin, the leucoanthocyanidin form of fisetinidin.

Mimosa and quebracho tannins are, according to a comparative ^{13}C NMR study of polyflavonoids, found to be predominantly profisetinidin/prorobinetidin-type tannins.

The expected masses found in mass spectrometry in quebracho tannin are 561, 833, 1105, 1377, 1393, 1651, 1667. Quebracho also yields gallic acid.
