= Curdione =

Names
- Preferred IUPAC name (3S,6E,10S)-6,10-Dimethyl-3-(propan-2-yl)cyclodec-6-ene-1,4-dione
- Other names Germacr-1(10)-ene-5,8-dione

Identifiers
CAS Number	13657–68–6
3D model (JSmol)	Interactive image
ChemSpider	4945563
PubChem CID	6441391
CompTox Dashboard (EPA)	DTXSID501045606
- InChI: InChI=1S/C15H24O2/c1-10(2)13-9-14(16)12(4)7-5-6-11(3)8-15(13)17/h6,10,12-13H,5,7-9H2,1-4H3/b11-6+/t12-,13-/m0/s1 Key: KDPFMRXIVDLQKX-NHFJXKHHSA-N
- SMILES: C[C@H]1CC/C=C(/CC(=O)[C@@H](CC1=O)C(C)C)\C

Properties
Chemical formula	C_{15}H_{24}O_{2}
Molar mass	236.355 g·mol^{−1}
- Except where otherwise noted, data are given for materials in their standard state (at 25 °C [77 °F], 100 kPa). Infobox references

Curdione is a chemical compound isolated from Curcuma wenyujin. Its molecular weight is 236.35 g/mol.
