= C15H10O4 =

The chemical formula C_{15}H_{10}O_{4} (molar mass: 254.24 g/mol, exact mass: 254.0579 u) may refer to:

- Chrysin, a flavone
- Chrysophanic acid
- Daidzein, an isoflavone
- 4',7-Dihydroxyflavone, a flavone
- 7,8-Dihydroxyflavone, a flavone
- Hispidol (6,4'-Dihydroxyaurone), an aurone
- Rubiadin, an anthraquinone
