= C15H12O8 =

The molecular formula C_{15}H_{12}O_{8} (molar mass : 320.25 g/mol, exact mass : 320.053217) may refer to:

- Ampelopsin (also known as dihydromyricetin), a flavanonol
- Dihydrogossypetin, a flavanonol
