= Luteolinidin =

Ion

Names
- IUPAC name 3′,4′,5,7-Tetrahydroxyflavylium
- Systematic IUPAC name 2-(3,4-Dihydroxyphenyl)-5,7-dihydroxy-1λ^{4}-benzopyran-1-ylium
- Other names 2-(3,4-dihydroxyphenyl)-5,7-dihydroxychromenylium 2-(3,4-Dihydroxy-phenyl)-5,7-dihydroxy-chromenylium

Identifiers
CAS Number	1154-78-5
3D model (JSmol)	Interactive image
ChemSpider	390308
PubChem CID	441701
UNII	M011G96EDA
CompTox Dashboard (EPA)	DTXSID20921728
- InChI: InChI=1S/C15H10O5/c16-9-6-12(18)10-2-4-14(20-15(10)7-9)8-1-3-11(17)13(19)5-8/h1-7H,(H3-,16,17,18,19)/p+1 Key: GDNIGMNXEKGFIP-UHFFFAOYSA-O; InChI=1/C15H10O5/c16-9-6-12(18)10-2-4-14(20-15(10)7-9)8-1-3-11(17)13(19)5-8/h1-7H,(H3-,16,17,18,19)/p+1 Key: GDNIGMNXEKGFIP-IKLDFBCSAL
- SMILES: C1=CC(=C(C=C1C2=[O+]C3=CC(=CC(=C3C=C2)O)O)O)O

Properties
Chemical formula	C_{15}H_{11}O_{5}^{+}
Molar mass	271.24 g/mol
- Except where otherwise noted, data are given for materials in their standard state (at 25 °C [77 °F], 100 kPa). verify (what is ?) Infobox references

Luteolinidin is a member of the 3-deoxyanthocyanidins. It is an orange pigment, found e.g. in Sorghum bicolor.

== Glycosides ==
Luteolinidin 5-O-β-D-[3-O-β-D-glucopyranosyl-2-O-acetylglucopyranoside] (a 3-deoxyanthocyanidin laminaribioside) can be found in the fern Parablechnum novae-zelandiae (syn. Blechnum novae-zelandiae).

== Antioxidant effect ==
In a study from 2017, Luteolinidin was found to have in vitro protective effect against LDL oxidation.

== See also ==
- List of compounds with carbon number 15
