= Dihydromorin =

Names
- IUPAC name (2R,3R)-2′,3,4′,5,7-Pentahydroxyflavan-4-one
- Systematic IUPAC name (2R,3R)-2-(2,4-Dihydroxyphenyl)-3,5,7-trihydroxy-4H-1-benzopyran-4-one

Identifiers
CAS Number	18422-83-8
3D model (JSmol)	Interactive image
ChemSpider	4572618
PubChem CID	5458714
UNII	BHC9FB8RFH
CompTox Dashboard (EPA)	DTXSID60939807
- InChI: InChI=1S/C15H12O7/c16-6-1-2-8(9(18)3-6)15-14(21)13(20)12-10(19)4-7(17)5-11(12)22-15/h1-5,14-19,21H/t14-,15+/m0/s1 Key: QIWOFDHUQPJCJF-LSDHHAIUSA-N; InChI=1/C15H12O7/c16-6-1-2-8(9(18)3-6)15-14(21)13(20)12-10(19)4-7(17)5-11(12)22-15/h1-5,14-19,21H/t14-,15+/m0/s1 Key: QIWOFDHUQPJCJF-LSDHHAIUBR
- SMILES: C1=CC(=C(C=C1O)O)[C@@H]2[C@H](C(=O)C3=C(C=C(C=C3O2)O)O)O

Properties
Chemical formula	C_{15}H_{12}O_{7}
Molar mass	304.25 g/mol
- Except where otherwise noted, data are given for materials in their standard state (at 25 °C [77 °F], 100 kPa). verify (what is ?) Infobox references

Dihydromorin is a flavanonol, a type of flavonoid. It can be found in plants of the family Moraceae including Morus nigra (Black mulberry), in Morus alba, Maclura pomifera (Maclura aurantiaca or Osage-Orange), in the jackfruit (Artocarpus heterophyllus) and in Artocarpus dadah.

Dihydromorin is an inhibitor of tyrosinase.

== See also ==
- Norartocarpetin, the corresponding flavone
