= Benzthiazide =

Chemical compound

Clinical data
- AHFS/Drugs.com: International Drug Names
- Routes of administration: Oral
- ATC code: none

Legal status
- Legal status: In general: ℞ (Prescription only)

Pharmacokinetic data
- Bioavailability: 60 to 70%
- Protein binding: 30%
- Elimination half-life: 5 to 15 hours
- Excretion: Renal

Identifiers
- IUPAC name: 6-chloro-1,1-dioxo-3-(phenylmethylsulfanylmethyl)- 4H-benzo[e][1,2,4]thiadiazine-7-sulfonamide
- CAS Number: 91-33-8
- PubChem CID: 2343
- IUPHAR/BPS: 7125
- DrugBank: DB00562
- ChemSpider: 2253
- UNII: 1TD8J48L61
- KEGG: D00651
- ChEBI: CHEBI:3047
- ChEMBL: ChEMBL1201039
- CompTox Dashboard (EPA): DTXSID4022658
- ECHA InfoCard: 100.001.874

Chemical and physical data
- Formula: C_{15}H_{14}ClN_{3}O_{4}S_{3}
- Molar mass: 431.92 g·mol^{−1}
- 3D model (JSmol): Interactive image
- SMILES: O=S(=O)(c1c(Cl)cc2c(c1)S(=O)(=O)/N=C(\N2)CSCc3ccccc3)N
- InChI: InChI=1S/C15H14ClN3O4S3/c16-11-6-12-14(7-13(11)25(17,20)21)26(22,23)19-15(18-12)9-24-8-10-4-2-1-3-5-10/h1-7H,8-9H2,(H,18,19)(H2,17,20,21); Key:NDTSRXAMMQDVSW-UHFFFAOYSA-N

Benzthiazide (BAN/INN, also known as benzothiazide; trade names Aquatag, Dihydrex, Diucen, Edemax, Exna, Foven and others) is a thiazide diuretic used in the treatment of high blood pressure and edema. It is no longer available in the United States.

In the United Kingdom, it was also sold in combination with the potassium-sparing diuretic triamterene under the trade name Dytide. The same combination is still available in Switzerland as Dyrenium compositum.
