= Leucofisetinidin =

Names
- IUPAC name (2R,3S,4R)-Flavan-3,3′,4,4′,7-pentol
- Systematic IUPAC name (2R,3S,4R)-2-(3,4-Dihydroxyphenyl)-3,4-dihydro-2H-1-benzopyran-3,4,7-triol
- Other names (+)-Leucofisetinidin (+)-Mollisacacidin (+)-7:3':4'-Trihydroxyflavan-3:4-diol; Fisetinidol-4alpha-ol; Leuco-fisetinidin

Identifiers
CAS Number	967-27-1
3D model (JSmol)	Interactive image
ChemSpider	24842601
PubChem CID	164762
CompTox Dashboard (EPA)	DTXSID50914385 DTXSID40393165, DTXSID50914385
- InChI: InChI=1S/C15H14O6/c16-8-2-3-9-12(6-8)21-15(14(20)13(9)19)7-1-4-10(17)11(18)5-7/h1-6,13-20H/t13-,14+,15-/m1/s1 Key: OFZBQQUVMQGHDJ-QLFBSQMISA-N
- SMILES: OC2c3ccc(O)cc3OC(C2O)c(cc1O)ccc1O

Properties
Chemical formula	C_{15}H_{14}O_{6}
Molar mass	290.271 g·mol^{−1}
- Except where otherwise noted, data are given for materials in their standard state (at 25 °C [77 °F], 100 kPa). Infobox references

Leucofisetinidin is a flavan-3,4-diol (leucoanthocyanidin), a type of natural phenolic substance. It is the monomer of condensed tannins called profisetinidins. Those tannins can be extracted from the heartwood of Acacia mearnsii or from the heartwoods of Schinopsis balansae, Schinopsis quebrachocolorado and from commercial quebracho extract.

== See also ==
- Fisetinidin
