= 6-Hydroxycyanidin =

- Chemical structure of 6-hydroxycyanidin

Names
- IUPAC name 3,3′,4′,5,6,7-Hexahydroxyflavylium
- Systematic IUPAC name 2-(3,4-Dihydroxyphenyl)-3,5,6,7-tetrahydroxy-1λ^{4}-benzopyran-1-ylium
- Other names 6-Hydroxycyanidin; Quercetagetinidin

Identifiers
CAS Number	42529-06-6
3D model (JSmol)	Interactive image; Interactive image
ChEBI	CHEBI:28090
ChemSpider	390305
PubChem CID	441697
UNII	3X52YLJ8GX
CompTox Dashboard (EPA)	DTXSID30331612
- InChI: InChI=1S/C15H10O7/c16-8-2-1-6(3-9(8)17)15-11(19)4-7-12(22-15)5-10(18)14(21)13(7)20/h1-5H,(H5-,16,17,18,19,20,21)/p+1 Key: PWDAKBACEAGRSH-UHFFFAOYSA-O; InChI=1S/C15H10O7/c16-8-2-1-6(3-9(8)17)15-11(19)4-7-12(22-15)5-10(18)14(21)13(7)20/h1-5H,(H5-,16,17,18,19,20,21)/p+1 Key: PWDAKBACEAGRSH-IKLDFBCSAI; Key: PWDAKBACEAGRSH-UHFFFAOYSA-O
- SMILES: Oc1c(O)cc2[o+]c(-c(cc3O)ccc3O)c(O)cc2c1O; Oc1ccc(cc1O)c3[o+]c2cc(O)c(O)c(O)c2cc3O

Properties
Chemical formula	C_{15}H_{11}O_{7} (C_{15}H_{11}ClO_{7})
Molar mass	303.24 g/mol
- Except where otherwise noted, data are given for materials in their standard state (at 25 °C [77 °F], 100 kPa). verify (what is ?) Infobox references

6-Hydroxycyanidin is an anthocyanidin.

== Glycosides ==
6-Hydroxycyanidin 3-malonylglucoside can be extracted from the flowers of Alstroemeria sp.
