= Fustin =

Names
- IUPAC name (2R,3R)-3,3′,4′,7-Tetrahydroxyflavan-4-one
- Systematic IUPAC name (2R,3R)-2-(3,4-Dihydroxyphenyl)-3,7-dihydroxy-2,3-dihydro-4H-1-benzopyran-4-one
- Other names 2,3-Dihydrofisetin; 3,7,3',4'-Tetrahydroxyflavanone; 2,3-Dihydrofisetin; 3′,4′,7-Trihydroxyflavanol

Identifiers
CAS Number	20725-03-5
3D model (JSmol)	Interactive image
ChEBI	CHEBI:5202
ChEMBL	ChEMBL470267
ChemSpider	4476304
ECHA InfoCard	100.039.975
EC Number	243-989-6
KEGG	C01378
PubChem CID	5317435
UNII	4994C1X19A
CompTox Dashboard (EPA)	DTXSID401136309
- InChI: InChI=1S/C15H12O6/c16-8-2-3-9-12(6-8)21-15(14(20)13(9)19)7-1-4-10(17)11(18)5-7/h1-6,14-18,20H/t14-,15+/m0/s1 Key: FNUPUYFWZXZMIE-LSDHHAIUSA-N
- SMILES: C1=CC(=C(C=C1[C@@H]2[C@H](C(=O)C3=C(O2)C=C(C=C3)O)O)O)O

Properties
Chemical formula	C_{15}H_{12}O_{6}
Molar mass	288.255 g·mol^{−1}
- Except where otherwise noted, data are given for materials in their standard state (at 25 °C [77 °F], 100 kPa). verify (what is ?) Infobox references

Fustin, sometimes called "dihydrofisetin", is a flavanonol, a type of flavonoid. It can be found in young fustic (Cotinus coggygria) and in the lacquer tree (Toxicodendron vernicifluum).

Fustin shows protective effects on 6-hydroxydopamine-induced neuronal cell death.

Unlike fisetin, fustin has no double bond in the C-ring. This makes fustin a flavan, with two stereocenters and four stereoisomers.
