= Rosewood, California =

Rosewood, California may refer to:

- Rosewood, Humboldt County, California
- Rosewood, Tehama County, California
