= Flavonoid 3′-monooxygenase =

Class of enzymes

Identifiers
- EC no.: 1.14.14.82
- CAS no.: 85340-98-3

Databases
- IntEnz: IntEnz view
- BRENDA: BRENDA entry
- ExPASy: NiceZyme view
- KEGG: KEGG entry
- MetaCyc: metabolic pathway
- PRIAM: profile
- PDB structures: RCSB PDB PDBe PDBsum
- Gene Ontology: AmiGO / QuickGO
Search
- PMC: articles
- PubMed: articles
- NCBI: proteins

Flavonoid 3′-monooxygenase (EC 1.14.14.82, originally classified as EC 1.14.13.21) is an enzyme that catalyzes the chemical reaction

a flavonoid + NADPH + H^{+} + O_{2} $\rightleftharpoons$ a 3′-hydroxyflavonoid + NADP^{+} + H_{2}O

For example, naringenin is converted to eriodictyol:

naringenin
+ NADPH
O_{2} + H^{+}
H_{2}O
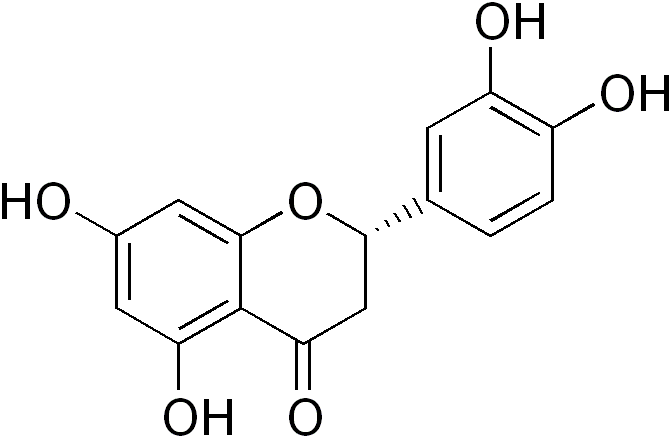
eriodictyol
+ NADP^{+}

The enzyme uses molecular oxygen and reduced nicotinamide adenine dinucleotide phosphate (NADPH) to insert a hydroxy group into a specific position in one of the benzene rings of the starting material.

It is a cytochrome P450 protein containing heme which acts as an oxidoreductase. The systematic name of this enzyme class is flavonoid,NADPH:oxygen oxidoreductase (3′-hydroxylating). Other names in common use include flavonoid 3′-hydroxylase, flavonoid 3-hydroxylase (erroneous), NADPH:flavonoid-3′-hydroxylase, and flavonoid 3-monooxygenase (erroneous). In palnts including Matthiola incana from which it was first characterised, it is part of the pathway to anthocyanins.
