= Columnidin =

- Chemical structure of columnidin

Names
- IUPAC name 3′,4′,5,7,8-Pentahydroxyflavylium
- Preferred IUPAC name 2-(3,4-Dihydroxyphenyl)-5,7,8-trihydroxy-1λ^{4}-benzopyran-1-ylium

Identifiers
3D model (JSmol)	Interactive image
ChemSpider	30780721
PubChem CID	57459464
CompTox Dashboard (EPA)	DTXSID101028787
- InChI: InChI=1S/C15H10O6/c16-9-3-1-7(5-11(9)18)13-4-2-8-10(17)6-12(19)14(20)15(8)21-13/h1-6H,(H4-,16,17,18,19,20)/p+1 Key: USQSSTLNPXPPHA-UHFFFAOYSA-O; InChI=1/C15H10O6/c16-9-3-1-7(5-11(9)18)13-4-2-8-10(17)6-12(19)14(20)15(8)21-13/h1-6H,(H4-,16,17,18,19,20)/p+1 Key: USQSSTLNPXPPHA-IKLDFBCSAT
- SMILES: C1=CC(=C(C=C1C2=[O+]C3=C(C=C2)C(=CC(=C3O)O)O)O)O

Properties
Chemical formula	C_{15}H_{11}O_{6}^{+}
Molar mass	287.244
- Except where otherwise noted, data are given for materials in their standard state (at 25 °C [77 °F], 100 kPa). verify (what is ?) Infobox references

Columnidin is an orange red pigment, belonging to the 3-deoxyanthocyanidins found in red-flowered western-hemisphere gesneriad species such as episcias, columneas, sarmientas, and sinningias.

The columnidin is named after the gesneriad genus Columnea in which it is found, notably in Columnea hybrida.
