= Guibourtinidol =

- Chemical structure of guibourtinidol

Names
- IUPAC name (2R,3S)-Flavan-3,4′,7-triol
- Systematic IUPAC name (2R,3S)-2-(4-Hydroxyphenyl)-3,4-dihydro-2H-1-benzopyran-2,7-diol

Identifiers
3D model (JSmol)	Interactive image
ChemSpider	8054006
PubChem CID	9878329
CompTox Dashboard (EPA)	DTXSID201029376
- InChI: InChI=1S/C15H14O4/c16-11-4-1-9(2-5-11)15-13(18)7-10-3-6-12(17)8-14(10)19-15/h1-6,8,13,15-18H,7H2/t13-,15+/m0/s1 Key: RHYGXRGFSFQNLC-DZGCQCFKSA-N; InChI=1/C15H14O4/c16-11-4-1-9(2-5-11)15-13(18)7-10-3-6-12(17)8-14(10)19-15/h1-6,8,13,15-18H,7H2/t13-,15+/m0/s1 Key: RHYGXRGFSFQNLC-DZGCQCFKBZ
- SMILES: Oc1ccc(cc1)[C@H]3Oc2cc(O)ccc2C[C@@H]3O

Properties
Chemical formula	C_{15}H_{14}O_{4}
Molar mass	258.27 g/mol
- Except where otherwise noted, data are given for materials in their standard state (at 25 °C [77 °F], 100 kPa). verify (what is ?) Infobox references

Guibourtinidol is a flavan-3-ol. It can be found in the heartwood of Cassia abbreviata.
