= Esprocarb =

Weed control herbicide

Names
- Preferred IUPAC name S-benzyl ethyl[(2Ξ)-3-methylbutan-2-yl]carbamothioate
- Other names: S-benzyl ethyl[(2RS)-3-methylbutan-2-yl]carbamothioate; S-benzyl (RS)-(1,2-dimethylpropyl)ethyl(thiocarbamate); S-(phenylmethyl) N-(1,2-dimethylpropyl)-N-ethylcarbamothioate; SC-2957 or ICIA-2957

Identifiers
| CAS Number | 85785-20-2 |
| 3D model (JSmol) | Interactive image |
| ChEBI | CHEBI:34743 |
| ChEMBL | ChEMBL2252174 |
| ChemSpider | 82838 |
| ECHA InfoCard | 100.111.286 |
| EC Number | 617-761-5 |
| KEGG | C14526 |
| PubChem CID | 91740 |
| UNII | 1H15E85N9B |
| CompTox Dashboard (EPA) | DTXSID2058201 |
- InChI: InChI=1S/C15H23NOS/c1-5-16(13(4)12(2)3)15(17)18-11-14-9-7-6-8-10-14/h6-10,12-13H,5,11H2,1-4H3 Key: BXEHUCNTIZGSOJ-UHFFFAOYSA-N
- SMILES: CCN(C(C)C(C)C)C(=O)SCc1ccccc1

Properties
| Chemical formula | C_{15}H_{23}NOS |
| Molar mass | 265.42 g·mol^{−1} |
| Appearance | Yellowish liquid |
| Odor | Odourless |
| Density | 1.035 g/mL |
| Melting point | 25 °C (77 °F; 298 K) |
| Boiling point | 135 °C (275 °F; 408 K) |
| Solubility in water | 0.0049 g/L |
| Vapor pressure | 10.1 mPa |

Hazards
- GHS labelling
| Pictograms | (GHS06: Toxic) (GHS09: Environmental hazard) |
| Signal word | Danger |
| Hazard statements | H315, H319, H331, H411 |
| Precautionary statements | P261, P280, P305+P351+P338, P321, P405, P501 |
- Lethal dose or concentration (LD, LC)
| LD_{50} (median dose) | >2000g/kg (rat, oral); >2000g/kg (rat, dermal) |
| LC_{50} (median concentration) | >4 mg/L (mammal, inhalation, 4 hours) |
- Except where otherwise noted, data are given for materials in their standard state (at 25 °C [77 °F], 100 kPa). Infobox references

Esprocarb is a thiocarbamate herbicide used preëmergently and post emergently to control annual weeds and grasses, such as on paddy rice. It was introduced in 1988 in Japan

Esprocarb mixes have been tested in Japan starting in 1985 for its effectiveness against cockspur grass (Echinochloa crus-galli), often mixed with the herbicide bensulfuron-methyl. Testing for esprocarb was meant to allow for a longer, residual control of weeds, eliminating the need for follow-up one-shot herbicide applications.

Esprocarb's mode of action makes its HRAC classification Group K3 (global), Group K (Aus), Group 15 (numeric); it inhibits very long chain fatty acid synthesis.

It is usually sold as granules and has been marketed as "Fuji-Grass".

== Environmental behavior ==
Esprocarb is toxic to fish; its 96-hour LC_{50} for fish is 1.52 g/L. It is not toxic to birds or mammals, with an LD_{50} over 2000 mg/kg. It has a GHS 'Toxic' mark, though its low toxicity should exempt it.

It is non-mobile in soil and has a soil half-life of 50 days, making it moderately persistent.
