= Tricetinidin =

Tricetinidin (chloride)

Names
- IUPAC name 5-(5,7-dihydroxychromenylium-2-yl)benzene-1,2,3-triol chloride

Identifiers
CAS Number	chloride: 65618-21-5
3D model (JSmol)	Interactive image; chloride: Interactive image
ChEBI	CHEBI:179145
ChemSpider	9374719; chloride: 16405480
PubChem CID	11199650; chloride: 14496542
UNII	chloride: US6S794JZM
CompTox Dashboard (EPA)	DTXSID70561012
- InChI: InChI=1S/C15H10O6/c16-8-5-10(17)9-1-2-13(21-14(9)6-8)7-3-11(18)15(20)12(19)4-7/h1-6H,(H4-,16,17,18,19,20)/p+1 Key: CMPNIWQMRYYTMK-UHFFFAOYSA-O; chloride: InChI=1S/C15H10O6.ClH/c16-8-5-10(17)9-1-2-13(21-14(9)6-8)7-3-11(18)15(20)12(19)4-7;/h1-6H,(H4-,16,17,18,19,20);1H Key: MSRWCRMKQPGZND-UHFFFAOYSA-N
- SMILES: C1=CC(=[O+]C2=CC(=CC(=C21)O)O)C3=CC(=C(C(=C3)O)O)O; chloride: C1=CC(=[O+]C2=CC(=CC(=C21)O)O)C3=CC(=C(C(=C3)O)O)O.[Cl-]

Properties
Chemical formula	C_{15}H_{11}O_{6}^{+} (Cl^{−})
Molar mass	287.24 g/mol (cation), 322.69 g/mol (chloride)
- Except where otherwise noted, data are given for materials in their standard state (at 25 °C [77 °F], 100 kPa). verify (what is ?) Infobox references

Tricetinidin is an intense red-colored chemical compound belonging to the 3-deoxyanthocyanidins. It can be found in black tea infusions. Tricetinidin, in tea, would be a product of the oxidative degallation of epigallocatechin gallate (EGCG).
