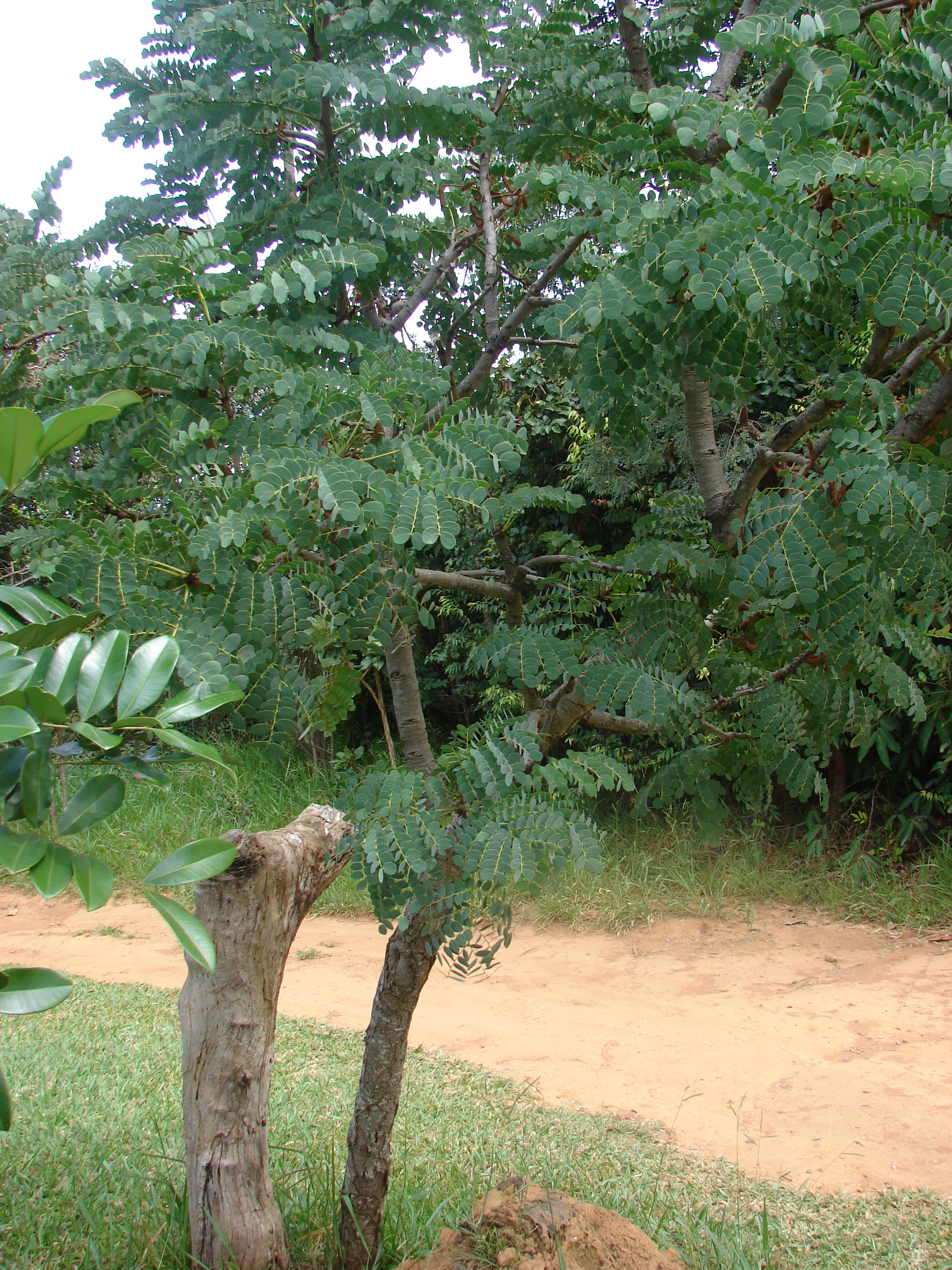

Scientific classification
- Kingdom: Plantae
- Clade: Embryophytes
- Clade: Tracheophytes
- Clade: Angiosperms
- Clade: Eudicots
- Clade: Rosids
- Order: Fabales
- Family: Fabaceae
- Subfamily: Caesalpinioideae
- Clade: Mimosoid clade
- Genus: Stryphnodendron
- Species: S. adstringens

Binomial name
- Stryphnodendron adstringens (Mart.) Coville

= Stryphnodendron adstringens =

Species of legume

Stryphnodendron adstringens (Portuguese: barbatimão) is a species of legume in the genus Stryphnodendron found in Brazil.

Holcocera cerradicola is a moth, whose larvae feed on S. adstringens.

== Chemistry ==
Stryphnodendron adstringens stem bark is used to produce tannins of the prorobinetinidins (flavanols oligomers containing robinetinidol) or prodelphinidins type. These are robinetinidol-(4β → 8)-epigallocatechin, robinetinidol-(4α → 8)-epigallocatechin, robinetinidol-(4β → 8)-epigallocatechin 3-O-gallate, robinetinidol-(4α → 8)-epigallocatechin 3-O-gallate, robinetinidol-(4α → 6)-gallocatechin and robinetinidol-(4α → 6)-epigallocatechin, in addition to the tentatively characterized, robinetinidol [4β → 6(8)]-gallocatechin and robinetinidol-(4α → 8)-gallocatechin.
