= Norartocarpetin =

Names
- IUPAC name 2′,4′,5,7-Tetrahydroxyflavone
- Systematic IUPAC name 2-(2,4-Dihydroxyphenyl)-5,7-dihydroxy-4H-1-benzopyran-4-one

Identifiers
CAS Number	520-30-9
3D model (JSmol)	Interactive image
ChemSpider	4587698
EC Number	208-287-6
PubChem CID	5481970
UNII	L2Y5RSY4BM
CompTox Dashboard (EPA)	DTXSID00199963
- InChI: InChI=1S/C15H10O6/c16-7-1-2-9(10(18)3-7)13-6-12(20)15-11(19)4-8(17)5-14(15)21-13/h1-6,16-19H Key: ZSYPIPFQOQGYHH-UHFFFAOYSA-N; InChI=1/C15H10O6/c16-7-1-2-9(10(18)3-7)13-6-12(20)15-11(19)4-8(17)5-14(15)21-13/h1-6,16-19H Key: ZSYPIPFQOQGYHH-UHFFFAOYAJ
- SMILES: C1=CC(=C(C=C1O)O)C2=CC(=O)C3=C(C=C(C=C3O2)O)O

Properties
Chemical formula	C_{15}H_{10}O_{6}
Molar mass	286.23 g/mol
- Except where otherwise noted, data are given for materials in their standard state (at 25 °C [77 °F], 100 kPa). Infobox references

Norartocarpetin is a flavone. It is found in Artocarpus dadah.

== See also ==
- Dihydromorin, the corresponding flavanonol.
