= Xyloxadine =

Names
- Preferred IUPAC name rac-2-[(1R)-1-(2,5-dimethylphenyl)(ethanesulfonyl)]pyridin-1-ium-1-olate
- Other names: dimenoxypyrin; ксилоксадин; UBI-S734

Identifiers
CAS Number	60263-88-9
3D model (JSmol)	Interactive image
ChEMBL	ChEMBL142228
ChemSpider	438436
PubChem CID	501133
UNII	65VT190PLJ
CompTox Dashboard (EPA)	DTXSID3041871
- InChI: InChI=1S/C15H17NO3S/c1-11-7-8-12(2)14(10-11)13(3)20(18,19)15-6-4-5-9-16(15)17/h4-10,13H,1-3H3 Key: SMPPYMOPSFKMQX-UHFFFAOYSA-N
- SMILES: CC1=CC(=C(C=C1)C)C(C)S(=O)(=O)C2=CC=CC=[N+]2[O-]

Properties
Chemical formula	C_{15}H_{17}NO_{3}S
Molar mass	291.37 g·mol^{−1}
- Except where otherwise noted, data are given for materials in their standard state (at 25 °C [77 °F], 100 kPa). Infobox references

Xyloxadine, or dimenoxypyrin, is a pyridine herbicide which was never commercialised. It controls barnyard grass, foxtail and switch grass. PPDB reports it to be first mentioned in 2016, however a Japanese study from 2014 explains a method for its synthesis.

Chemically, xyloxadine technical grade is a racemate. It is a derivative of acetyl chloride, sodium pyrithione and p-xylene.

== Links ==
- Xyloxadine in the Pesticide Properties DataBase (PPDB)
- Xyloxadine on GSRS
- Xyloxadine on Comptox
