= Curzerene =

Names
- IUPAC name (6S)-6-Ethenyl-3,6-dimethyl-5-prop-1-en-2-yl-5,7-dihydro-4H-1-benzofuran
- Other names Isogermafuren; Isofuranogermacrene

Identifiers
3D model (JSmol)	Interactive image
ChemSpider	4475318
PubChem CID	5316217
- InChI: InChI=1S/C15H20O/c1-6-15(5)8-14-12(11(4)9-16-14)7-13(15)10(2)3/h6,9,13H,1-2,7-8H2,3-5H3/t13?,15-/m1/s1 Key: HICAMHOOTMOHPA-AWKYBWMHSA-N
- SMILES: CC1=COC2=C1CC([C@](C2)(C)C=C)C(=C)C

Properties
Chemical formula	C_{15}H_{20}O
Molar mass	216.324 g·mol^{−1}
Melting point	65.3 °C estimated
Boiling point	282.8±40.0 °C estimated
Solubility in water	Poorly soluble in water

Hazards
Flash point	117.50 °C
- Except where otherwise noted, data are given for materials in their standard state (at 25 °C [77 °F], 100 kPa). Infobox references

Curzerene is a volatile, aromatic terpenoid found in many herbs and spices, such as Curcuma zeodaria. It is a bioactive isolate of Caribbean corals and is also found in myrrh. More specifically it has been found to make up a significant portion - 12.97% - of the smoke produced from burning Commiphora myrrha oleo gum resin. It is also a major component of myrrh oil, which has been shown in vitro to possess anti-inflammatory properties at sub-toxic by inhibiting the production of the inflammatory cytokine IL-6 by human gingival fibroblasts. Anecdotal evidence exists to support the anti-inflammatory effect of myrrh oil.

Curzerene represents 13.7% of the essential oil extracted from Smyrnium olusatrum, which has demonstrated significant antimicrobial activity in vitro.
