= Moracin M =

Names
- Preferred IUPAC name 5-(6-Hydroxy-1-benzofuran-2-yl)benzene-1,3-diol
- Other names Veraphenol

Identifiers
CAS Number	56317-21-6
3D model (JSmol)	Interactive image
ChEMBL	ChEMBL512578
ChemSpider	161549
PubChem CID	185848
UNII	L9FI83128D
CompTox Dashboard (EPA)	DTXSID20204861
- InChI: InChI=1S/C14H10O4/c15-10-2-1-8-5-13(18-14(8)7-10)9-3-11(16)6-12(17)4-9/h1-7,15-17H Key: LHPRYOJTASOZGJ-UHFFFAOYSA-N; InChI=1/C14H10O4/c15-10-2-1-8-5-13(18-14(8)7-10)9-3-11(16)6-12(17)4-9/h1-7,15-17H Key: LHPRYOJTASOZGJ-UHFFFAOYAJ
- SMILES: C1=CC2=C(C=C1O)OC(=C2)C3=CC(=CC(=C3)O)O

Properties
Chemical formula	C_{14}H_{10}O_{4}
Molar mass	242.230 g·mol^{−1}
- Except where otherwise noted, data are given for materials in their standard state (at 25 °C [77 °F], 100 kPa). Infobox references

Moracin M is a phosphodiesterase-4 inhibitor isolated from Morus alba.
