= Guibourtinidin =

Guibourtinidin (chloride)

Names
- IUPAC name 2-(4-hydroxyphenyl)chromenylium-3,7-diol
- Other names Guibourtinidin chloride 3,7,4'-Trihydroxyflavylium chloride

Identifiers
CAS Number	ion: 23130-31-6; chloride: 13544-54-2
3D model (JSmol)	ion: Interactive image; chloride: Interactive image
ChemSpider	chloride: 15076754
PubChem CID	ion: 20481741; chloride: 20481740
UNII	ion: 5K4V6C6T6B
CompTox Dashboard (EPA)	ion: DTXSID40607810; chloride: DTXSID80275976
- InChI: ion: InChI=1S/C15H10O4/c16-11-4-1-9(2-5-11)15-13(18)7-10-3-6-12(17)8-14(10)19-15/h1-8H,(H2-,16,17,18)/p+1 Key: ZGQPDIBIQDDUNF-UHFFFAOYSA-O; chloride: InChI=1S/C15H10O4.ClH/c16-11-4-1-9(2-5-11)15-13(18)7-10-3-6-12(17)8-14(10)19-15;/h1-8H,(H2-,16,17,18);1H Key: ADQYOABEIDHQIG-UHFFFAOYSA-N
- SMILES: ion: C1=CC(=CC=C1C2=C(C=C3C=CC(=CC3=[O+]2)O)O)O; chloride: Oc1ccc(-c2[o+]c3cc(O)ccc3cc2O)cc1.[Cl-]

Properties
Chemical formula	C_{15}H_{11}O_{4}+ Cl^{−}
Molar mass	255.24 g/mol
- Except where otherwise noted, data are given for materials in their standard state (at 25 °C [77 °F], 100 kPa). verify (what is ?) Infobox references

Guibourtinidin is an anthocyanidin.

== Tannins ==
Guibourtinidin forms tannins called leucoguibourtinidins or proguibourtinidins.
