= 1,1-Diphenylacetone =

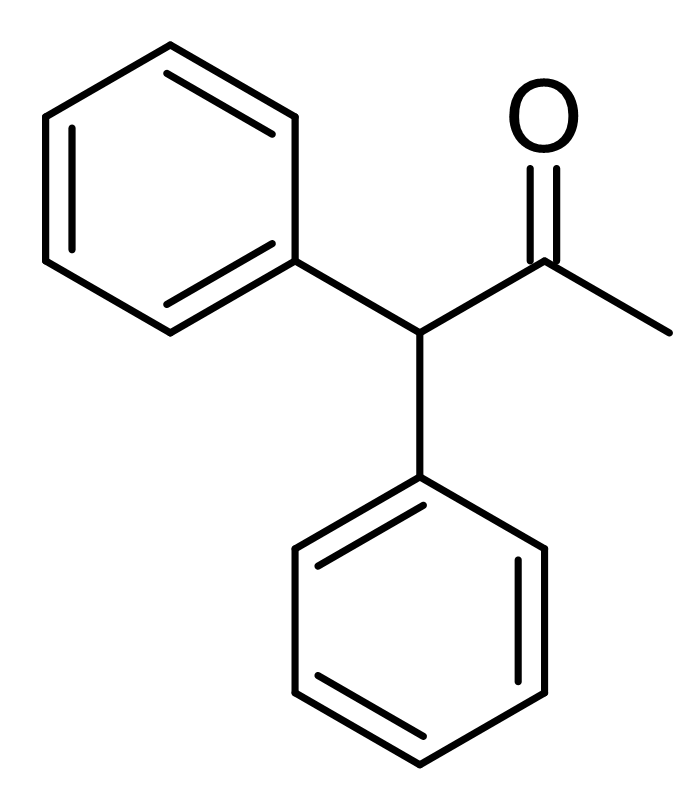
- Skeletal formula

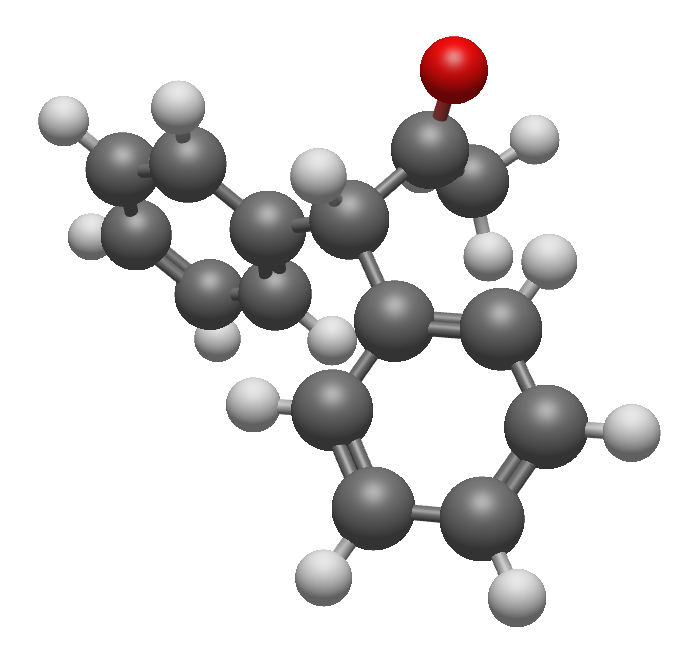
Ball-and-stick model of 1,1-diphenylacetone
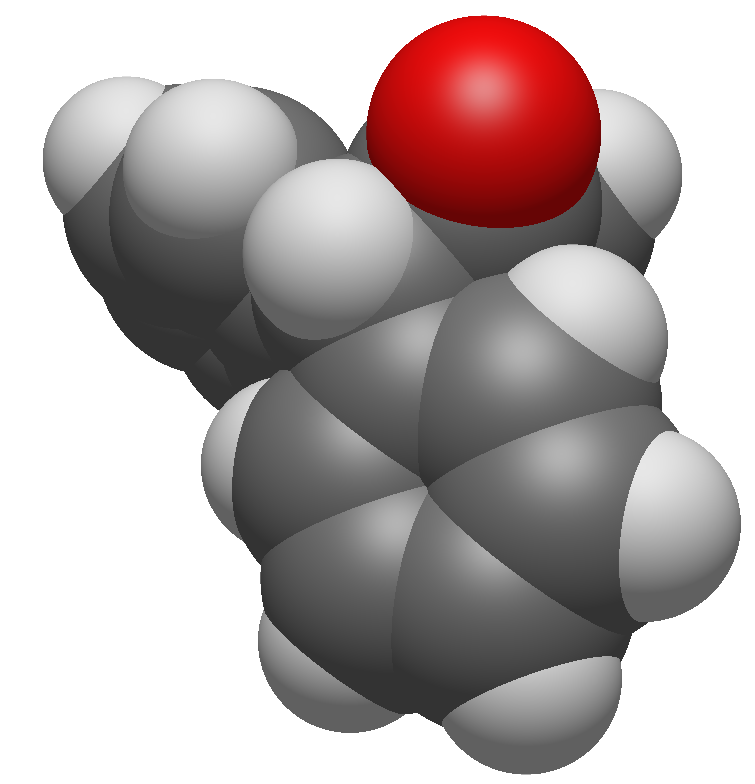
Van der Waals space filling model of 1,1-diphenylacetone

Names
- Preferred IUPAC name 1,1-Diphenylpropan-2-one
- Other names 1,1-Diphenylacetone

Identifiers
CAS Number	781-35-1
3D model (JSmol)	Interactive image
ChemSpider	63102
ECHA InfoCard	100.011.189
EC Number	212-307-9
PubChem CID	69907
CompTox Dashboard (EPA)	DTXSID8061137
- InChI: InChI=1S/C15H14O/c1-12(16)15(13-8-4-2-5-9-13)14-10-6-3-7-11-14/h2-11,15H,1H3 Key: DBNWBEGCONIRGQ-UHFFFAOYSA-N
- SMILES: CC(=O)C(C1=CC=CC=C1)C2=CC=CC=C2

Properties
Chemical formula	C_{15}H_{14}O
Molar mass	210.276 g·mol^{−1}
Appearance	white solid
Melting point	46 °C (115 °F; 319 K)
Boiling point	307 °C (585 °F; 580 K)
- Except where otherwise noted, data are given for materials in their standard state (at 25 °C [77 °F], 100 kPa). Infobox references

1,1-Diphenylacetone is an organic compound composed of a benzhydryl group and a methyl group attached to a central carbonyl group.

== Preparation ==
One method is where phenylacetone is dissolved in benzene, reacted with bromine to effect an α-keto bromination and stirred for 3-6 hours. Then this mixture is slowly added to a solution of anhydrous aluminium chloride in benzene to catalyze a Friedel-Crafts alkylation. A lengthy workup of the reaction mixture ends in recrystallization of the product 1,1-diphenylacetone from petroleum ether.

Alternative syntheses:

== Applications ==
1. β-Phenylmethamphetamine
2. Diphenadione
