= Mutisianthol =

Names
- Preferred IUPAC name (1S,3R)-3,6-Dimethyl-1-(2-methylprop-1-en-1-yl)-2,3-dihydro-1H-inden-5-ol

Identifiers
CAS Number	70855-59-3
3D model (JSmol)	Interactive image
ChemSpider	24750874
PubChem CID	12168490
UNII	F69DJ259PV
CompTox Dashboard (EPA)	DTXSID20479072
- InChI: InChI=1S/C15H20O/c1-9(2)5-12-6-10(3)13-8-15(16)11(4)7-14(12)13/h5,7-8,10,12,16H,6H2,1-4H3/t10-,12-/m1/s1 Key: SVNPNOPENVFTBB-ZYHUDNBSSA-N
- SMILES: Cc1cc2c(cc1O)[C@@H](C[C@H]2C=C(C)C)C

Properties
Chemical formula	C_{15}H_{20}O
Molar mass	216.324 g·mol^{−1}
- Except where otherwise noted, data are given for materials in their standard state (at 25 °C [77 °F], 100 kPa). verify (what is ?) Infobox references

Mutisianthol is a sesquiterpene compound found in Mutisia homoeantha. It was first isolated by Bohlmann et al. in 1979.
