= List of phytochemicals in food =

The following is a list of phytochemicals present in foods.

== Terpenoids (isoprenoids) ==
=== Carotenoids (tetraterpenoids) ===
==== Carotenes ====
orange pigments

- α-Carotene – to vitamin A: carrots, pumpkins, maize, tangerine, orange
- β-Carotene – to vitamin A: dark, leafy greens, red, orange and yellow fruits and vegetables.
- γ-Carotene - to vitamin A
- δ-Carotene
- ε-carotene
- Lycopene: Vietnamese Gac, tomatoes, grapefruit, watermelon, guava, apricots, carrots, autumn olive.
- Neurosporene: tomato, pink grapefruit,watermelon
- Phytofluene: star fruit, sweet potato, orange
- Phytoene: sweet potato, orange

==== Xanthophylls ====
yellow pigments

- Canthaxanthin: paprika, mushrooms, crustaceans, fish and eggs .
- β-Cryptoxanthin to vitamin A: mango, tangerine, orange, papaya, peaches, avocado, pea, grapefruit, kiwi
- Zeaxanthin: wolfberry, spinach, kale, turnip greens, maize, eggs, red pepper, pumpkin, orange
- Astaxanthin: microalgae, yeast, krill, shrimp, salmon, lobsters, and some crabs
- Lutein: spinach, turnip greens, romaine lettuce, eggs, red pepper, pumpkin, mango, papaya, oranges, kiwi, peaches, squash, brassicas, prunes, sweet potatoes, honeydew melon, rhubarb, plum, avocado, pear, cilantro
- Rubixanthin: rose hip

=== Triterpenoids ===
- Saponins: soybeans, beans, other legumes, maize, alfalfa
- Oleanolic acid: American pokeweed, honey mesquite, garlic, java apple, cloves, and many other Syzygium species
- Ursolic acid: apples, basil, bilberries, cranberries, elder flower, peppermint, lavender, oregano, thyme, hawthorn, prunes
- Betulinic acid: Ber tree, white birch, winged beans, tropical carnivorous plants Triphyophyllum peltatum, Ancistrocladus heyneanus, Diospyros leucomelas a member of the persimmon family, Tetracera boiviniana, the jambul (Syzygium formosanum), chaga (Inonotus obliquus), and many other Syzygium species
- Moronic acid: Rhus javanica (a sumac), mistletoe

=== Diterpenes ===
- Cafestol: Coffea arabica in unfiltered form such as French press coffee or Turkish coffee/Greek coffee

=== Monoterpenes ===
- Limonene: oils of citrus, cherries, spearmint, dill, garlic, celery, maize, rosemary, ginger, basil
- Perillyl alcohol: citrus oils, hops, caraway, mints
- Thujones: oils of Thyme, Oregano, Sage, Mugwort, Juniper

=== Steroids ===
- Phytosterols: almonds, cashews, peanuts, sesame seeds, sunflower seeds, whole wheat, maize, soybeans, many vegetable oils
  - Campesterol: buckwheat
  - β-Sitosterol: avocado, rice bran, wheat germ, corn oils, fennel, peanuts, soybeans, hawthorn, basil, buckwheat
  - gamma sitosterol
  - Stigmasterol: buckwheat

== Phenolic compounds ==
=== Natural monophenols ===
- Apiole: parsley, celery leaf
- Carnosol: rosemary, sage
- Carvacrol: oregano, thyme, pepperwort, wild bergamot
- Dillapiole: dill, fennel root

=== Polyphenols ===
==== Flavonoids ====
red, blue, purple pigments

- Flavonols
  - Quercetin: red and yellow onions, tea, wine, apples, cranberries, buckwheat, beans, lovage
  - Kaempferol: tea, strawberries, gooseberries, cranberries, grapefruit, apples, peas, brassicates (broccoli, kale, brussels sprouts, cabbage), chives, spinach, endive, leek, tomatoes
  - Myricetin: grapes, red wine, berries, walnuts
  - Fisetin: strawberries, cucumbers
  - Rutin: citrus fruits, oranges, lemons, limes, grapefruit, berries, peaches, apples, pagoda tree fruits, asparagus, buckwheat, parsley, tomatoes, apricots, rhubarb, tea
  - Isorhamnetin: red turnip, goldenrod, mustard leaf, ginkgo biloba, onion
- Flavanones
  - Hesperidin: citrus fruits
  - Naringenin: citrus fruits
  - Silybin: milk thistle
  - Eriodictyol: citrus fruits
- Flavones
  - Acacetin: Robinia pseudoacacia, Turnera diffusa
  - Apigenin: chamomile, celery, parsley
  - Chrysin: Passiflora caerulea, Pleurotus ostreatus, Oroxylum indicum
  - Diosmetin: Vicia
  - Tangeritin: tangerine and other citrus peels
  - Luteolin: beets, artichokes, celery, carrots, celeriac, rutabaga, parsley, mint, chamomile, lemongrass, chrysanthemum
- Flavan-3-ols (flavanols)
  - Catechins: white tea, green tea, black tea, grapes, wine, apple juice, cocoa and chocolate, lentils, black-eyed peas
    - (+)-Catechin
    - (+)-Gallocatechin
    - (−)-Epicatechin
    - (−)-Epigallocatechin
    - (−)-Epigallocatechin gallate (EGCG): green tea
    - (−)-Epicatechin 3-gallate
  - Theaflavin: black tea
    - Theaflavin-3-gallate: black tea
  - Thearubigins: black tea
  - Proanthocyanidins
- Flavanonols
- Anthocyanidins (flavonals) and Anthocyanins red wine, many red, purple or blue fruits and vegetables
  - Pelargonidin: bilberry, raspberry, strawberry
  - Peonidin: bilberry, blueberry, cherry, cranberry, peach
  - Cyanidin: red apple & pear, bilberry, blackcurrant, blackberry, blueberry, cherry, cranberry, peach, plum, hawthorn, loganberry, cocoa and chocolate
  - Delphinidin: bilberry, blackcurrant, blueberry, eggplant
  - Malvidin: malve, bilberry, blueberry
  - Petunidin
  - Phycocyanin: spirulina

==== Isoflavonoids ====
- Isoflavones (phytoestrogens) use the 3-phenylchromen-4-one skeleton (with no hydroxyl group substitution on carbon at position 2)
  - Daidzein (formononetin): soy, alfalfa sprouts, red clover, chickpeas, peanuts, kudzu, other legumes
  - Genistein (biochanin A): soy, alfalfa sprouts, red clover, chickpeas, peanuts, other legumes
  - Glycitein: soy
- Isoflavanes
- Isoflavandiols
- Isoflavenes
- Pterocarpans or Coumestans (phytoestrogens)
- Coumestrol: red clover, alfalfa sprouts, soy, peas, brussels sprouts

==== Flavonolignans ====
- Silymarin: artichokes, milk thistle

==== Lignans ====
Phytoestrogens: seeds (flax, sesame, pumpkin, sunflower, poppy), whole grains (rye, oats, barley), bran (wheat, oat, rye), fruits (particularly berries) and vegetables

- Matairesinol: flax seed, sesame seed, rye bran and meal, oat bran, poppy seed, strawberries, blackcurrants, broccoli
- Secoisolariciresinol: flax seeds, sunflower seeds, sesame seeds, pumpkin, strawberries, blueberries, cranberries, zucchini, blackcurrant, carrots
- Pinoresinol and lariciresinol: sesame seed, Brassica vegetables

==== Stilbenoids ====
- Resveratrol: grape (skins and seeds, grape wine), nuts, peanuts, Japanese Knotweed root
- Pterostilbene: grapes, blueberries
- Pinosylvin

==== Curcuminoids ====
- Curcumin (Oxidizes to vanillin): turmeric, mustard

==== Tannins ====
===== Hydrolyzable tannins =====
- Ellagitannins
  - Punicalagins: tea, berries
  - Castalagins
  - Vescalagins: oak wood
  - Castalins
  - Casuarictins
  - Grandinins
  - Punicalins
  - Roburin As
  - Tellimagrandin IIs
  - Terflavin Bs
- Gallotannins
  - Digalloyl glucose
  - 1,3,6-Trigalloyl glucose

===== Condensed tannins =====
- Proanthocyanidins: horse chestnut Aesculus hippocastanum, cranberry juice, peanut skin, grape
- Polyflavonoid tannins
- Catechol-type tannins
- Pyrocatecollic type tannins
- Flavolans

===== Phlorotannins =====
extracted from brown alga species (Ecklonia cava, Sargassum mcclurei), sea oak (Eisenia bicyclis, Fucus vesiculosus)

===== Flavono-ellagitannins =====
Extracted from Mongolian Oak (Quercus mongolica)

=== Aromatic acid ===
==== Phenolic acids ====
- Salicylic acid: peppermint, licorice, peanut, wheat
- Gallic acid: tea, mango, strawberries, rhubarb, soy
- Ellagic acid: walnuts, strawberries, cranberries, blackberries, guava, grapes

==== Hydroxycinnamic acids ====
- Caffeic acid: burdock, hawthorn, artichoke, pear, basil, thyme, oregano, apple, olive oil
- Chlorogenic acid: echinacea, strawberries, pineapple, coffee, sunflower, blueberries
- Cinnamic acid: cinnamon, aloe
- Ferulic acid: oats, rice, artichoke, orange, pineapple, apple, peanut, açaí oil
- Coumarin: citrus fruits, maize

=== Phenylethanoids ===
- Tyrosol: olive oil
- Hydroxytyrosol: olive oil
- Oleocanthal: olive oil
- Oleuropein: olive oil

=== Others ===
- Capsaicin: chilli peppers
- Gingerol: ginger
- Alkylresorcinols: wholegrain wheat, rye and barley
- Piperine: black pepper

== Glucosinolates ==
=== The precursor to isothiocyanates ===
- Sinigrin (the precursor to allyl isothiocyanate): broccoli family, brussels sprouts, black mustard
- Glucotropaeolin (the precursor to benzyl isothiocyanate)
- Gluconasturtiin (the precursor to phenethyl isothiocyanate)
- Glucoraphanin (the precursor to sulforaphane) brassicas: broccoli, cauliflower, brussels sprouts, cabbages

=== Aglycone derivatives ===
- Dithiolthiones (isothiocyanates)
  - Sulforaphane: brassicas (broccoli, cauliflower, brussels sprouts, cabbages)
  - Allyl isothiocyanate
  - Phenethyl Isothiocyanate
  - Benzyl Isothiocyanate
- Oxazolidine-2-thiones
- Nitriles
- Thiocyanates

=== Organosulfides/ Organosulfur compounds ===
- Polysulfides (allium compounds): garlic, onion, leeks, chive, shallot
- Sulfides
  - Diallyl disulfide garlic, onion, leek, chive, shallot
- Alliin garlic
- Allyl isothiocyanate: horseradish, mustard, wasabi
- Syn-propanethial-S-oxide: cut onion

=== Indoles ===
- Indole-3-carbinol: cabbage, kale, brussels sprouts, rutabaga, mustard greens, broccoli
- 3,3'-Diindolylmethane or DIM: broccoli family, brussels sprouts, cabbage, kale
- Indole-3-acetic acid: Commonly occurring plant hormone, a part of the auxin family.

== Betalains ==
- Betacyanins beets, chard, Amaranthus tricolor
  - betanin
  - isobetanin
  - probetanin
  - neobetanin
- Betaxanthins (non glycosidic versions)
  - Indicaxanthin: beets, sicilian prickly pear
  - Vulgaxanthin: beets

== Chlorophylls ==
- Chlorophyllin: Dark green leafy vegetables like spinach

== Other organic acids ==
- Saturated cyclic acids
  - Phytic acid: (inositol hexaphosphate) cereals, nuts, sesame seeds, soybeans, wheat, pumpkin, beans, almonds
  - Quinic acid
- Oxalic acid: orange, spinach, rhubarb, tea and coffee, banana, ginger, almond, sweet potato, bell pepper
- Tartaric acid: apricots, apples, sunflower, avocado, grapes, tamarind
- Anacardic acid: cashews, mangoes
- Malic acid: apples
- Caftaric acid: grapes
- Coutaric acid: grapes
- Fertaric acid

== Amines ==
- Betanin: beetroot

== Carbohydrates ==
=== Monosaccharides ===
- Hexose: wheat, barley
- Pentose: rye, oat

=== Polysaccharides ===
- Beta-glucan
  - Chitin: fungi includes other edible mushrooms
  - Lentinan: fruit body of shiitake (Lentinula edodes mycelium (LEM)) and other edible mushrooms
- Fructan
  - Inulins: diverse plants, e.g. topinambour, chicory
- Lignin: stones of fruits, vegetables (filaments of the garden bean), cereals
- Pectins: fruit skin (mainly apple and, quince), vegetables

== Protease inhibitors ==
- Protease inhibitors: soybean, seeds, legumes, potatoes, eggs, cereals

== See also ==
- Nutrient
- Essential nutrient
- List of macronutrients
- List of micronutrients
- List of food additives
- Underweight
