= Flavonoid =

Class of plant and fungus secondary metabolites

Flavonoids (or bioflavonoids; from the Latin word flavus, meaning yellow, their color in nature) are a class of polyphenolic secondary metabolites found in plants. Blackberry, black currant, chokeberry, and red cabbage are examples of plants with rich contents of flavonoids. In plant biology, flavonoids fulfill diverse functions, including attraction of pollinating insects, antioxidant protection against ultraviolet light, deterrence of environmental stresses and pathogens, and regulation of cell growth.

Although commonly consumed in human and animal plant foods and in dietary supplements, flavonoids are not considered to be nutrients or biological antioxidants essential to body functions, and have no established effects on human health or prevention of diseases.

Chemically, flavonoids have the general structure of a 15-carbon skeleton consisting of two phenyl rings (A and B) and a heterocyclic ring (C, the ring containing the embedded oxygen). This carbon structure can be abbreviated C6-C3-C6. According to the IUPAC nomenclature, they can be classified into flavonoids or bioflavonoids, isoflavonoids, derived from 3-phenylchromen-4-one (3-phenyl-1,4-benzopyrone) structure, and neoflavonoids, derived from 4-phenylcoumarin (4-phenyl-1,2-benzopyrone) structure.

As ketone-containing compounds, the three flavonoid classes are grouped as anthoxanthins (flavones and flavonols). This class was the first to be termed bioflavonoids. The terms flavonoid and bioflavonoid have also been more loosely used to describe non-ketone polyhydroxy polyphenol compounds, which are more specifically termed flavanoids.

== History ==
In the 1930s, Albert Szent-Györgyi and other scientists discovered that vitamin C alone was not as effective at preventing scurvy as the crude yellow extract from oranges, lemons or paprika. They attributed the increased activity of this extract to the other substances in this mixture, which they referred to as "citrin" (referring to citrus) or "vitamin P" (a reference to its effect on reducing the permeability of capillaries). The substances in question (hesperidin, eriodictyol, hesperidin methyl chalcone and neohesperidin) were later shown not to fulfil the criteria of a vitamin, so that the term "vitamin P" is now obsolete.

Molecular structure of the flavone backbone (2-phenyl-1,4-benzopyrone)

Isoflavan structure

Neoflavonoids structure

== Biosynthesis ==
Flavonoids are secondary metabolites synthesized mainly by plants. The general structure of flavonoids is a fifteen-carbon skeleton, containing two benzene rings connected by a three-carbon linking chain. Therefore, they are depicted as C6-C3-C6 compounds. Depending on the chemical structure, degree of oxidation, and unsaturation of the linking chain (C3), flavonoids can be classified into different groups, such as anthocyanidins, flavonols, flavanones, flavan-3-ols, flavanonols, flavones, and isoflavones. Chalcones, also called chalconoids, although lacking the heterocyclic ring, are also classified as flavonoids. Furthermore, flavonoids can be found in plants in glycoside-bound and free aglycone forms. The glycoside-bound form is the most common flavone and flavonol form consumed in the diet.

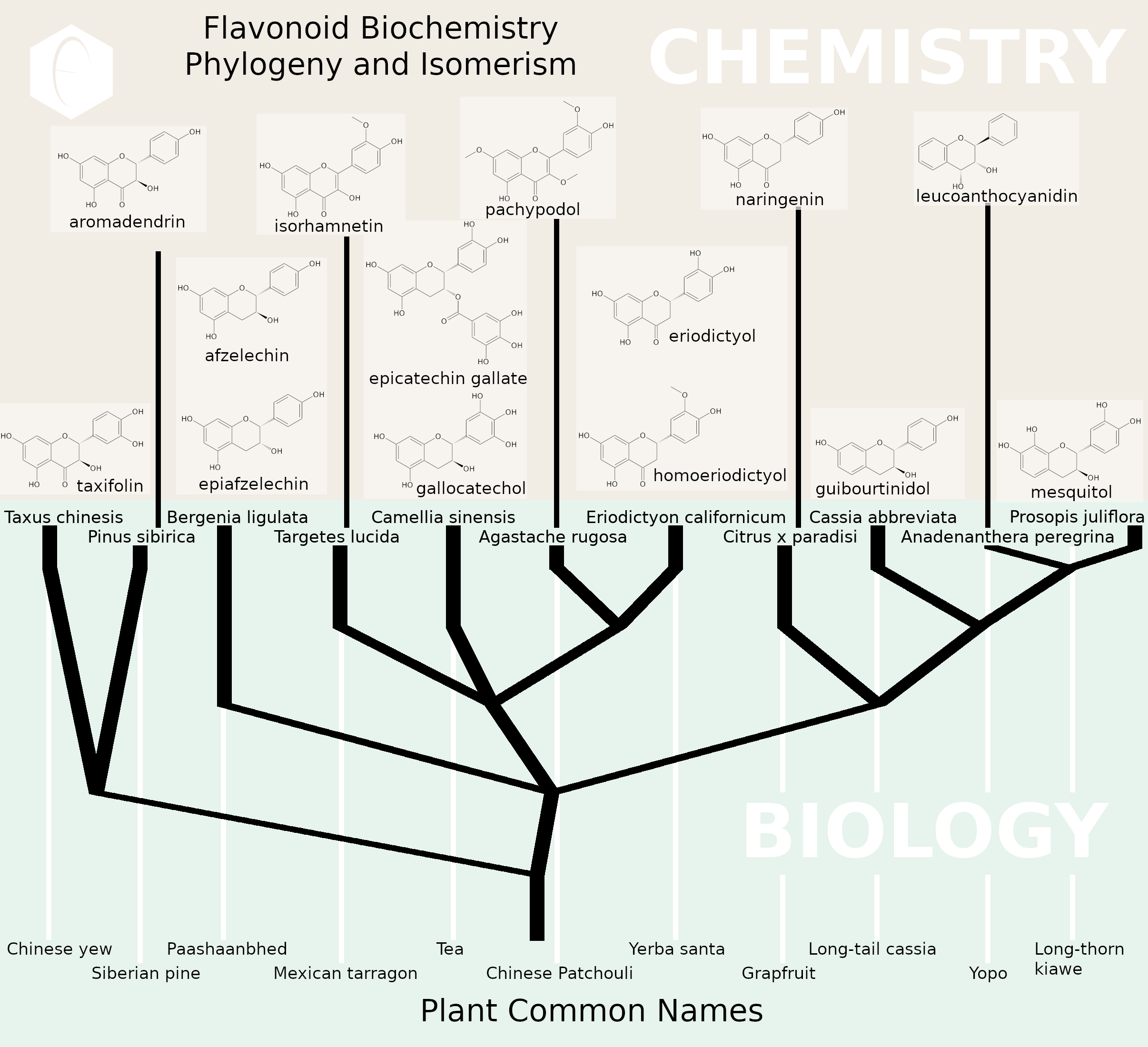
A biochemical diagram showing the class of flavonoids and their source in nature through various inter-related plant species.

== Functions in plants ==
Numbering some 5,000 individual compounds, flavonoids are widely distributed in plants, fulfilling numerous functions, including attraction of pollinating insects, deterrence of environmental stresses, and regulation of cell growth. They are the most important plant pigments for flower coloration, producing yellow, red or blue pigmentation in petals evolved to attract pollinators.

In higher plants, they are involved in antioxidant roles in plant cells, filtration of ultraviolet light, symbiotic nitrogen fixation, and defense against pathogens and pests. They also act as plant chemical messengers, physiological regulators, and cell cycle inhibitors. Flavonoids secreted by the root of their host plant help Rhizobia in the infection stage of their symbiotic relationship with legumes such as peas, beans, clover, and soy. Rhizobia living in soil are able to sense the flavonoids and this triggers the secretion of Nod factors, which in turn are recognized by the host plant and can lead to root hair deformation and several cellular responses such as ion fluxes and the formation of a root nodule. In addition, some flavonoids have inhibitory activity against organisms that cause plant diseases, e.g. Fusarium oxysporum.

== Subgroups ==
Flavonoids have been classified according to their chemical structure, and are usually subdivided into the following subgroups:

=== Anthocyanidins ===
Flavylium skeleton of anthocyanidins

Anthocyanidins are the aglycones of anthocyanins; they use the flavylium (2-phenylchromenylium) ion skeleton.

Examples: cyanidin, delphinidin, malvidin, pelargonidin, peonidin, petunidin

=== Anthoxanthins ===
Anthoxanthins are divided into two groups:

Group	Skeleton				Examples
Group	Description	Functional groups		Structural formula	Examples
Group	Description	3-hydroxyl	2,3-dihydro	Structural formula	Examples
Flavone	2-phenylchromen-4-one	✗	✗		Luteolin, Apigenin, Tangeritin
Flavonol or 3-hydroxyflavone	3-hydroxy-2-phenylchromen-4-one	✓	✗		Quercetin, Kaempferol, Myricetin, Fisetin, Galangin, Isorhamnetin, Pachypodol, Rhamnazin, Pyranoflavonols, Furanoflavonols,

=== Flavanones ===
Flavanones

Group	Skeleton				Examples
Group	Description	Functional groups		Structural formula	Examples
Group	Description	3-hydroxyl	2,3-dihydro	Structural formula	Examples
Flavanone	2,3-dihydro-2-phenylchromen-4-one	✗	✓		Hesperetin, Naringenin, Eriodictyol, Homoeriodictyol

=== Flavanonols ===
Flavanonols

Group	Skeleton				Examples
Group	Description	Functional groups		Structural formula	Examples
Group	Description	3-hydroxyl	2,3-dihydro	Structural formula	Examples
Flavanonol or 3-Hydroxyflavanone or 2,3-dihydroflavonol	3-hydroxy-2,3-dihydro-2-phenylchromen-4-one	✓	✓		Taxifolin (or Dihydroquercetin), Dihydrokaempferol

=== Flavans ===
Flavan structure

Include flavan-3-ols (flavanols), flavan-4-ols, and flavan-3,4-diols.

Skeleton	Name
Flavan-3-ol	Flavan-3-ol (flavanol)
Flavan-4ol	Flavan-4-ol
Flavan-3,4-diol	Flavan-3,4-diol (leucoanthocyanidin)

- Flavan-3-ols (flavanols)
  - Flavan-3-ols use the 2-phenyl-3,4-dihydro-2H-chromen-3-ol skeleton
  Examples: catechin (C), gallocatechin (GC), catechin 3-gallate (Cg), gallocatechin 3-gallate (GCg), epicatechins (EC), epigallocatechin (EGC), epicatechin 3-gallate (ECg), epigallocatechin 3-gallate (EGCg)
  - Theaflavin
  Examples: theaflavin-3-gallate, theaflavin-3'-gallate, theaflavin-3,3'-digallate
  - Thearubigin
  - Proanthocyanidins are dimers, trimers, oligomers, or polymers of the flavanols

=== Isoflavonoids ===
- Isoflavonoids
  - Isoflavones use the 3-phenylchromen-4-one skeleton (with no hydroxyl group substitution on carbon at position 2)
  Examples: genistein, daidzein, glycitein
  - Isoflavanes
  - Isoflavandiols
  - Isoflavenes
  - Coumestans
  - Pterocarpans

== Dietary sources ==
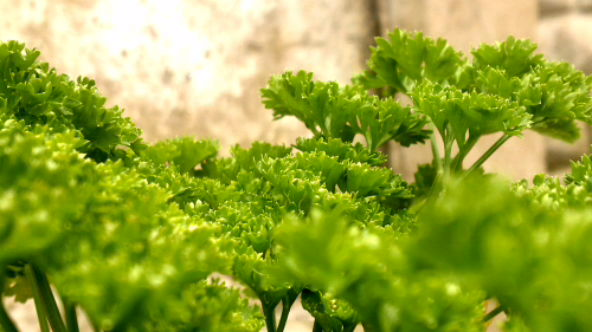
Parsley is a source of flavones

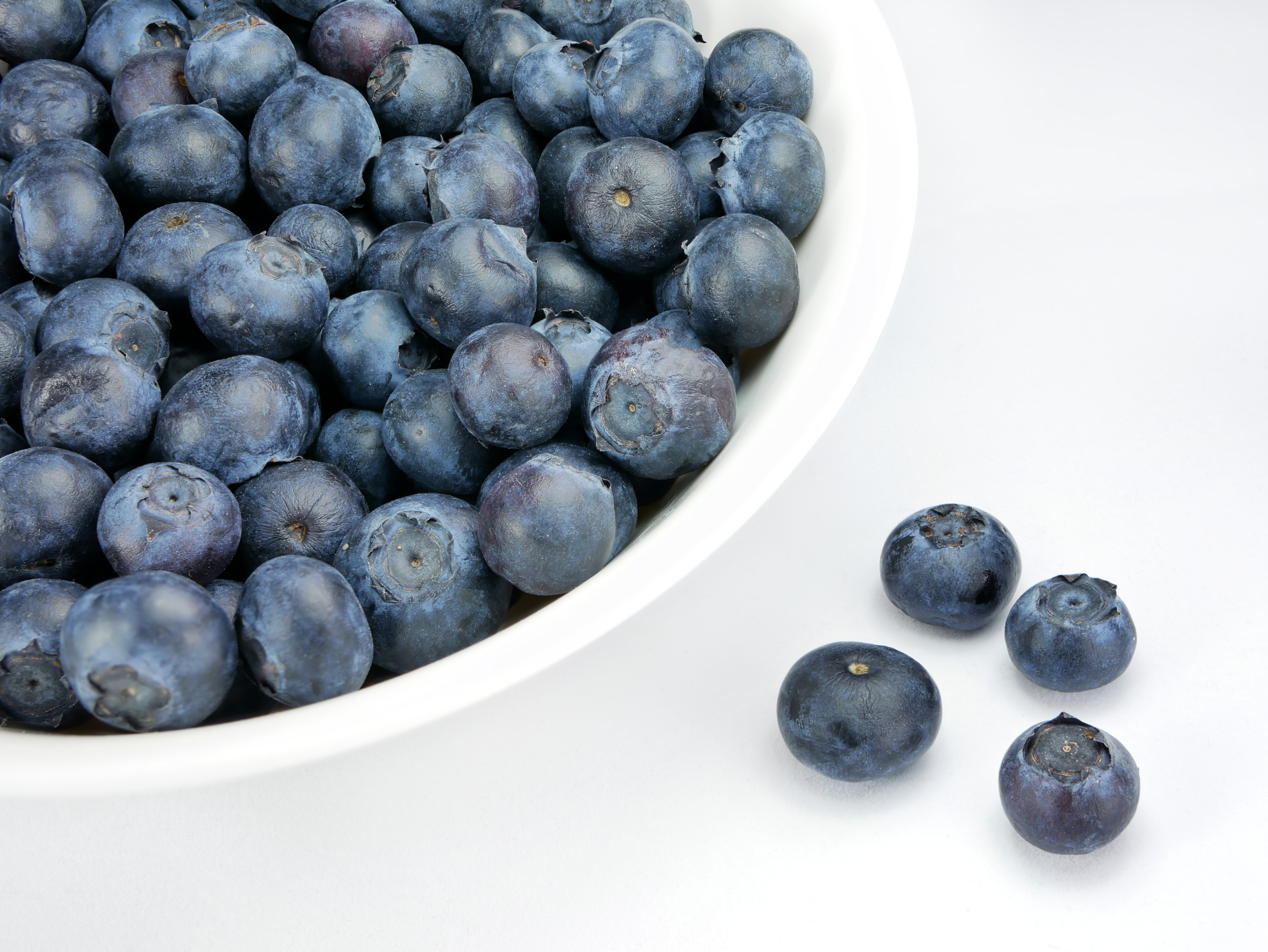
Blueberries are a source of dietary anthocyanins

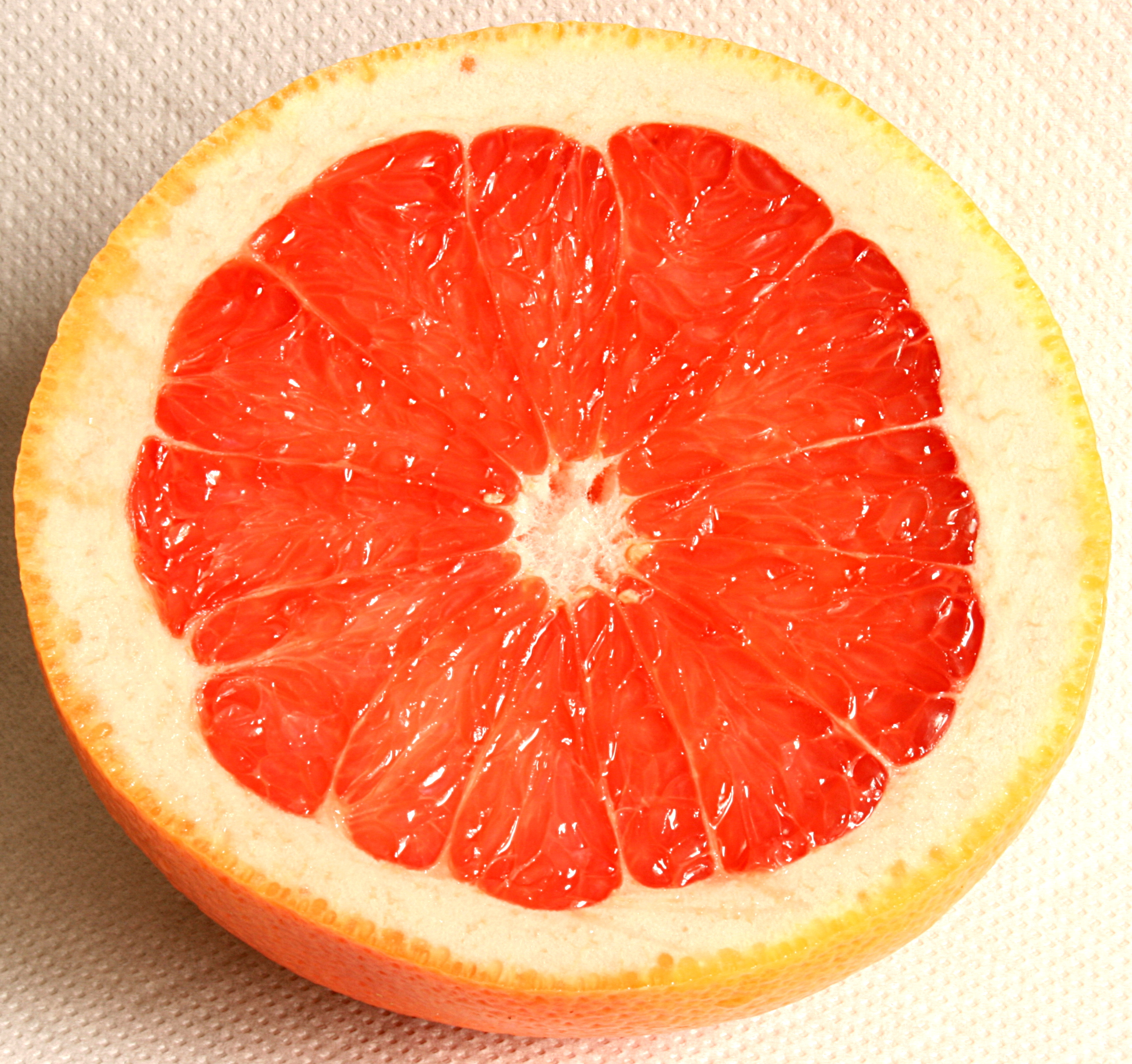
Flavonoids are found in citrus fruits, including red grapefruit

Flavonoids (specifically flavanoids such as the catechins) are "the most common group of polyphenolic compounds in the human diet and are found ubiquitously in plants". Flavonols, the original bioflavonoids such as quercetin, are also found ubiquitously, but in lesser quantities. The widespread distribution of flavonoids, their variety and their relatively low toxicity compared to other active plant compounds (for instance alkaloids) mean that many animals, including humans, ingest significant quantities in their diet.

Foods with a high flavonoid content include blackberries, black currants, parsley, onions, blueberries and strawberries, red cabbage, black tea, dark chocolate, and citrus fruits. One study found high flavonoid content in buckwheat.

Citrus flavonoids include hesperidin (a glycoside of the flavanone hesperetin), quercitrin, rutin (two glycosides of quercetin, and the flavone tangeritin. The flavonoids are less concentrated in the pulp than in the peels (for example, 165 versus 1156 mg/100 g in pulp versus peel of satsuma mandarin, and 164 vis-à-vis 804 mg/100 g in pulp versus peel of clementine).

Peanut (red) skin contains significant polyphenol content, including flavonoids.

== Dietary intake ==
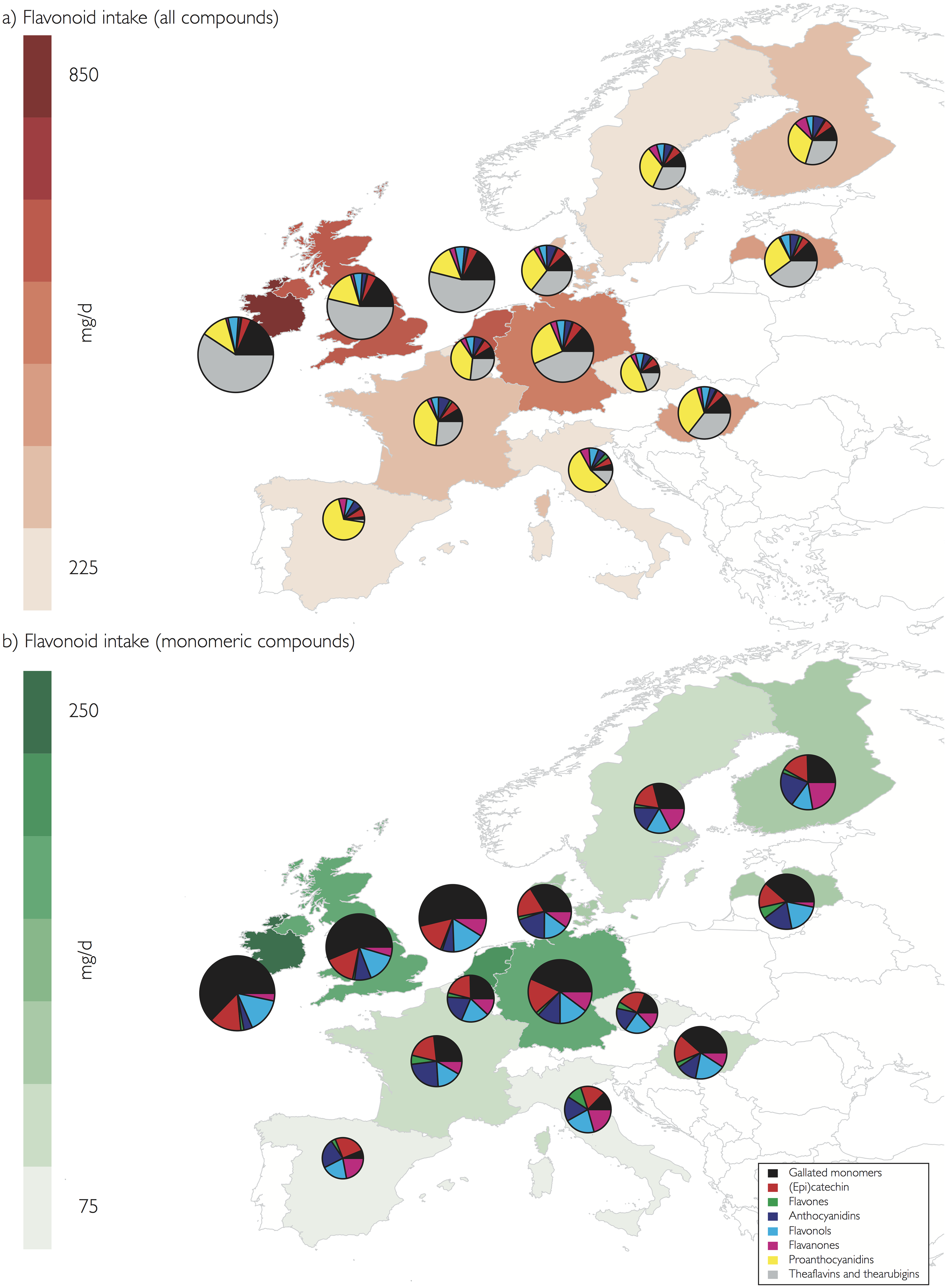
Adult flavonoid intake (mg per day) in Europe; pie charts indicate the relative consumption of different flavonoid compounds

Food composition data for flavonoids were provided by the 2021 USDA database on flavonoids and the 2013 Phenol Explorer database. In the United States NHANES survey, mean flavonoid intake was 190 mg per day in adults, with flavan-3-ols as the main contributor. In the European Union, based on data from the European Food Safety Authority (EFSA), mean flavonoid intake was 140 mg/d, although there were considerable differences among individual countries. The main type of flavonoids consumed in the EU and USA were flavan-3-ols (80% for USA adults), mainly from tea or cocoa in chocolate, while intake of other flavonoids was considerably lower.

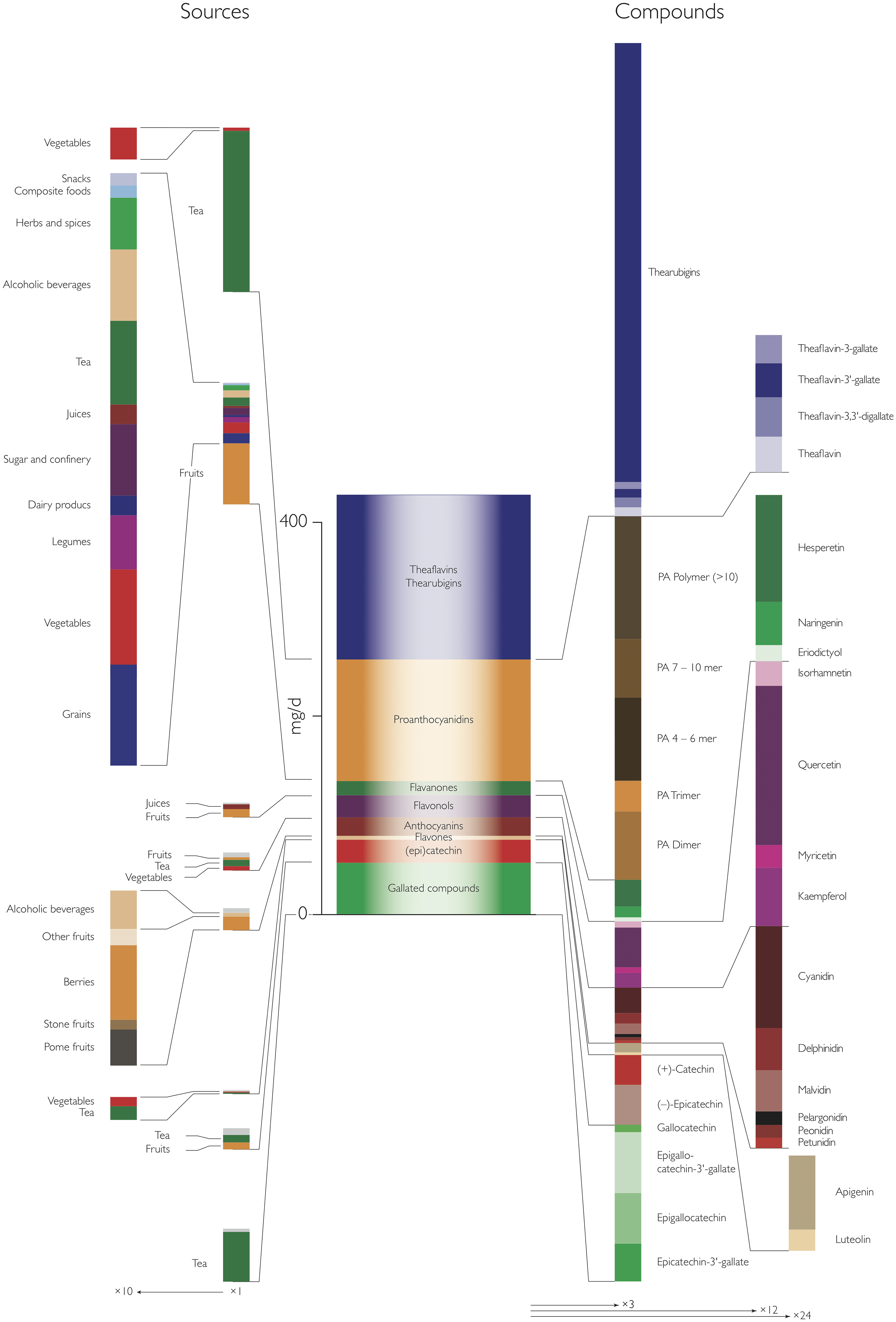
Data are based on mean flavonoid intake of all countries included in the 2011 EFSA Comprehensive European Food Consumption Database.

== Non-nutrient status in humans ==
Flavonoids are not considered as nutrients as they are not needed for growth, development and health maintenance. The European Food Safety Authority determined that dietary flavonoids do not reduce disease risk, affect physiological or behavioral functions, improve satiety, contribute calories, or influence the growth and development of children. In the United States, flavonoids and other polyphenols are not included on the FDA list of nutrients.

=== Metabolism and excretion ===
Flavonoids are a large and diverse group of compounds and differ considerably in their bioavailability and metabolism. Depending on the compound, they can be absorbed in the small intestine and metabolised by enterocytes and the liver, or they are metabolised by gut microbiota. Flavonoids have negligible antioxidant activity in the body due to extensive metabolism, and the increase in antioxidant capacity of blood seen after consumption of flavonoid-rich foods is not caused directly by flavonoids, but by production of uric acid resulting from flavonoid depolymerization and excretion.

=== Safety ===
There are no safety concerns and no adverse effects associated with high dietary intakes of flavonoids from foods, but high intakes of certain flavonoids from supplements have been linked to liver damage.

== Regulatory status ==
Catechin-containing Cianidanol (also known as Catergen), is a drug made from Uncaria gambir extract that was introduced in 1976 as a liver disorder treatment in Germany, Egypt, Switzerland, Austria, France and Italy. Following the investigation of a cluster of cases of haemolytic anaemia reported in 1985, the approval was revoked and the product withdrawn from the market in 1988.

The FDA has warned numerous dietary supplement and food manufacturers, including Unilever, producer of Lipton tea in the U.S., about illegal advertising and misleading health claims regarding flavonoids, such as that they lower cholesterol or relieve pain.

From 2020 to 2023, the FDA issued 11 warning letters to American manufacturers of flavonoid dietary supplements for false advertising of health claims and illegal misbranding of products.

== Research ==
=== Antioxidant research ===
Although flavonoids inhibit free radical activity in vitro, high dietary intakes in humans would be 100 to 1,000 times less than circulating concentrations of dietary and endogenous antioxidants, such as vitamin C, glutathione, and uric acid. Further, after digestion and metabolism in the body, flavonoid derivatives would have lower antioxidant activity than the parent flavonoid, rendering the smaller flavonoid metabolite with negligible antioxidant function.

=== Clinical research ===
Although numerous preliminary clinical studies have been conducted to assess the potential for dietary flavonoid intake to affect disease risk, research has been inconclusive due to limitations of experimental design and absence of cause-and-effect evidence.

=== Inflammation ===
Inflammation has been implicated as a possible origin of numerous local and systemic diseases, such as cancer, cardiovascular disorders, diabetes mellitus, and celiac disease. There is no clinical evidence that dietary flavonoids affect any of these diseases.

=== Cancer ===
Clinical studies investigating the relationship between flavonoid consumption and cancer prevention or development are conflicting for most types of cancer, probably because most human studies have weak designs, such as a small sample size. There is little evidence to indicate that dietary flavonoids affect human cancer risk in general.

=== Cardiovascular diseases ===
Although no significant association has been found between flavan-3-ol intake and cardiovascular disease mortality, clinical trials have shown improved endothelial function and reduced blood pressure (with a few studies showing inconsistent results). Reviews of cohort studies in 2013 found that the studies had too many limitations to determine a possible relationship between increased flavonoid intake and decreased risk of cardiovascular disease, although a trend for an inverse relationship existed.

In 2013, the EFSA decided to permit health claims that 200 mg/day of cocoa flavanols "help[s] maintain the elasticity of blood vessels." The FDA followed suit in 2023, stating that there is "supportive, but not conclusive" evidence that 200 mg per day of cocoa flavanols can reduce the risk of cardiovascular disease. This is greater than the levels found in typical chocolate bars, which can also contribute to weight gain, potentially harming cardiovascular health.

== Synthesis, detection, quantification, and semi-synthetic alterations ==
=== Color spectrum ===
Flavonoid synthesis in plants is induced by light color spectrums at both high and low energy radiations. Low energy radiations are accepted by phytochrome, while high energy radiations are accepted by carotenoids, flavins, cryptochromes in addition to phytochromes. The photomorphogenic process of phytochrome-mediated flavonoid biosynthesis has been observed in Amaranthus, barley, maize, Sorghum and turnip. Red light promotes flavonoid synthesis.

=== Availability through microorganisms ===
Research has shown production of flavonoid molecules from genetically engineered microorganisms.

=== Tests for detection ===
==== Shinoda test ====
Four pieces of magnesium filings are added to the ethanolic extract followed by few drops of concentrated hydrochloric acid. A pink or red colour indicates the presence of flavonoid. Colours varying from orange to red indicated flavones, red to crimson indicated flavonoids, crimson to magenta indicated flavonones.

==== Sodium hydroxide test ====
About 5 mg of the compound is dissolved in water, warmed, and filtered. 10% aqueous sodium hydroxide is added to 2 ml of this solution. This produces a yellow coloration. A change in color from yellow to colorless on addition of dilute hydrochloric acid is an indication for the presence of flavonoids.

==== p-Dimethylaminocinnamaldehyde test ====
A colorimetric assay based upon the reaction of A-rings with the chromogen p-dimethylaminocinnamaldehyde (DMACA) has been developed for flavanoids in beer that can be compared with the vanillin procedure.

=== Quantification ===
Lamaison and Carnet have designed a test for the determination of the total flavonoid content of a sample (AlCI_{3} method). After proper mixing of the sample and the reagent, the mixture is incubated for ten minutes at ambient temperature and the absorbance of the solution is read at 440 nm. Flavonoid content is expressed in mg/g of quercetin.

=== Semi-synthetic alterations ===
Immobilized Candida antarctica lipase can be used to catalyze the regioselective acylation of flavonoids.

== See also ==
- Phytochemical
- List of antioxidants in food
- List of phytochemicals in food
- Phytochemistry
- Homoisoflavonoids, related chemicals with a 16 carbons skeleton
