= Phenolic content in tea =

Natural plant compounds

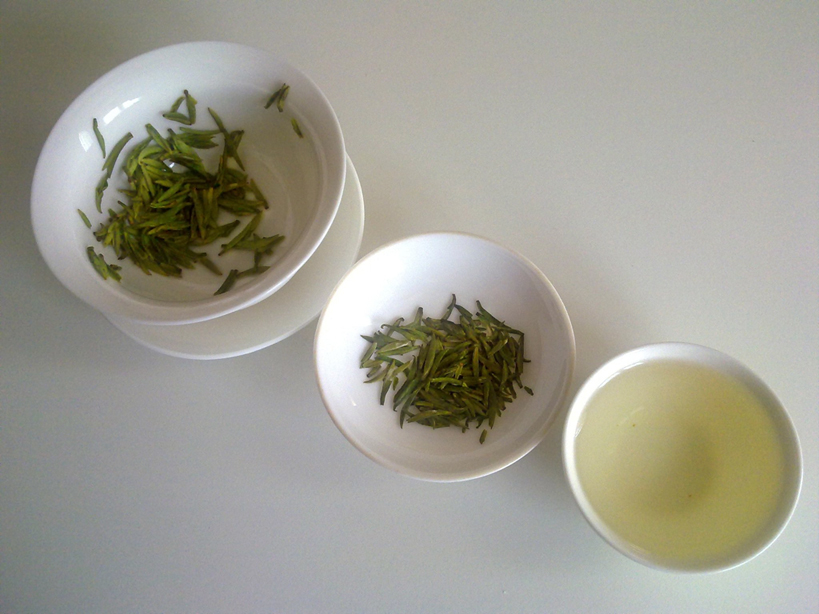
Most of the polyphenols in green tea are flavan-3-ols (catechins).

The phenolic content in tea refers to the phenols and polyphenols, natural plant compounds which are found in tea. These chemical compounds affect the flavor and mouthfeel of tea. Polyphenols in tea include catechins, theaflavins, tannins, and flavonoids.

Polyphenols found in green tea include, but are not limited to, epigallocatechin gallate (EGCG), epigallocatechin, epicatechin gallate, and epicatechin; flavanols such as kaempferol, quercetin, and myricitin are also in green tea.

== Catechins ==
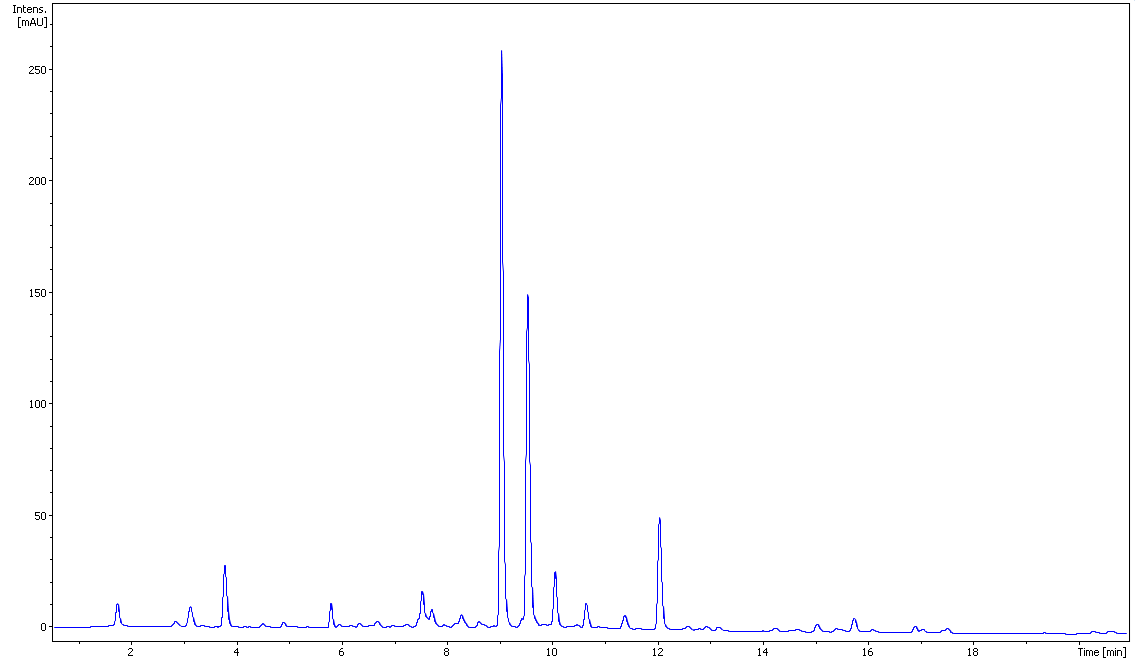
Green tea UV 280 nm chromatogram. Highest peak is caffeine, second highest is EGCG

Catechins include epigallocatechin-3-gallate (EGCG), epicatechin (EC), epicatechin-3-gallate (ECg), epigallocatechin (EGC), catechin, and gallocatechin (GC). The content of EGCG is higher in green tea.

Catechins constitute about 25% of the dry mass of a fresh tea leaf, although total catechin content varies widely depending on species, clonal variation, growing location, season, light variation, and altitude. They are present in nearly all teas made from Camellia sinensis, including white tea, green tea, black tea and oolong tea.

A 2011 analysis by the European Food Safety Authority found that a cause and effect relationship could not be shown for a link between tea catechins and the maintenance of normal blood LDL-cholesterol concentration.

4-Hydroxybenzoic acid, 3,4-dihydroxybenzoic acid (protocatechuic acid), 3-methoxy-4-hydroxy-hippuric acid and 3-methoxy-4-hydroxybenzoic acid (vanillic acid) are the main catechins metabolites found in humans after consumption of green tea infusions.

== Theaflavins ==
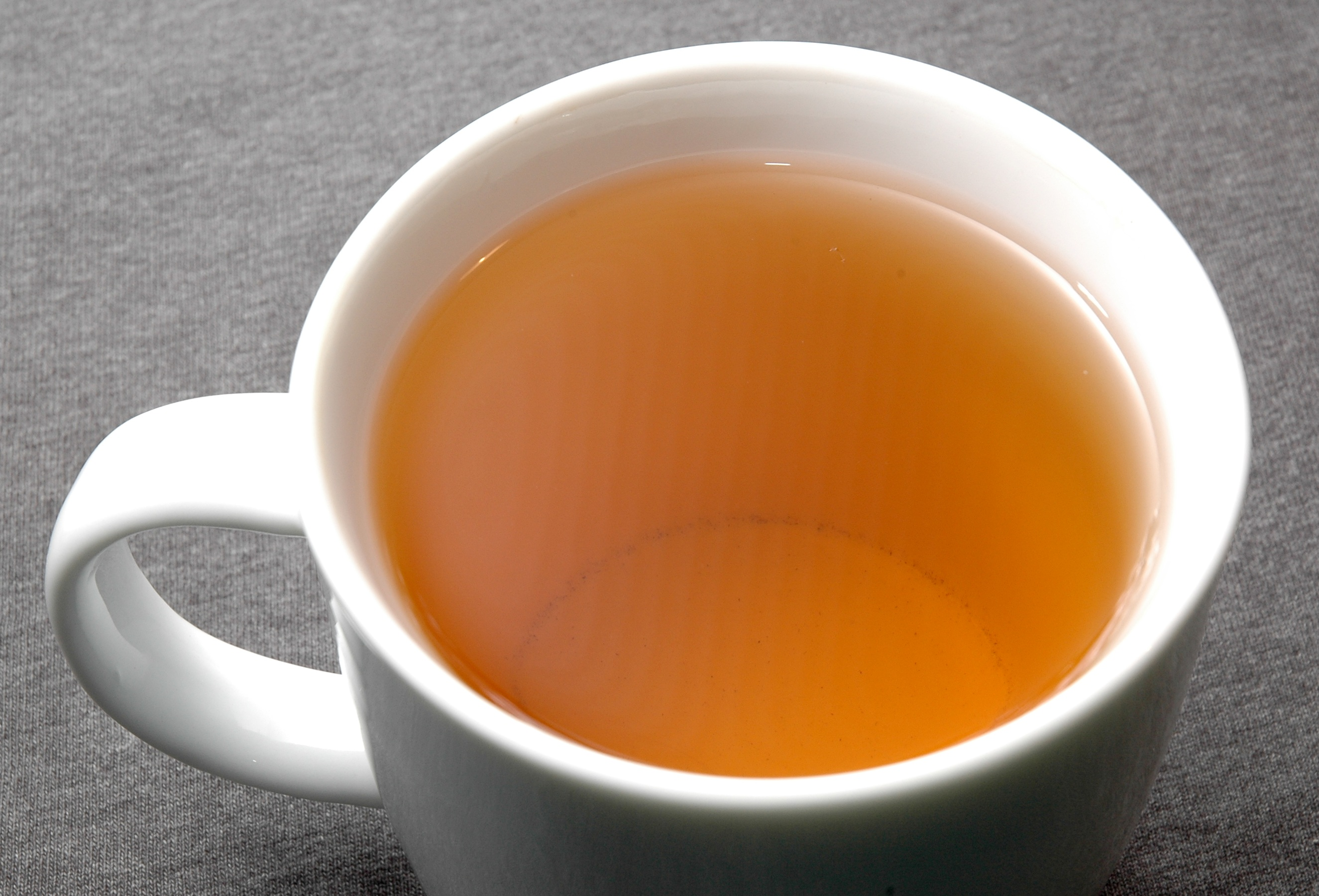
Darjeeling black tea infusion: Finer black tea has a more orange tone than red as a result of higher theaflavins content.

Catechin monomer structures are metabolized into dimers theaflavins and oligomers thearubigins with increasing degrees of oxidation of tea leaves. Theaflavins contribute to the bitterness and astringency of black tea. The mean amount of theaflavins in a cup of black tea (200 ml) is 12.18 mg.

Three main types of theaflavins are found in black tea, namely theaflavin (TF-1), theaflavin-3-gallate (TF-2), and theaflavin-3,3-digallate (TF-3).

== Tannins ==
Tannins are astringent, bitter polyphenolic compounds that bind to and precipitate organic compounds. Gallic acid conjugates all of the catechins, such as EGCG (Epigallocatechin gallate), which are tannins with astringent qualities.

== Flavonoids ==
Phenols called flavonoids are under preliminary research, as of 2020, but there is no evidence that flavonoids have antioxidant activity in vivo, or affect physical health or diseases. Tea has one of the highest contents of flavonoids among common food and beverage products. Catechins are the largest type of flavonoids in growing tea leaves. According to a report released by USDA, in a 200-ml cup of tea, the mean total content of flavonoids is 266.68 mg for green tea, and 233.12 mg for black tea.

== Research ==
A 2020 review found low- to moderate-quality evidence that daily tea consumption might lower the risk for cardiovascular disease and death.

== See also ==
- Health effects of tea
- Phenolic content in wine
