= Epicatechin gallate =

- Chemical structure of epicatechin gallate

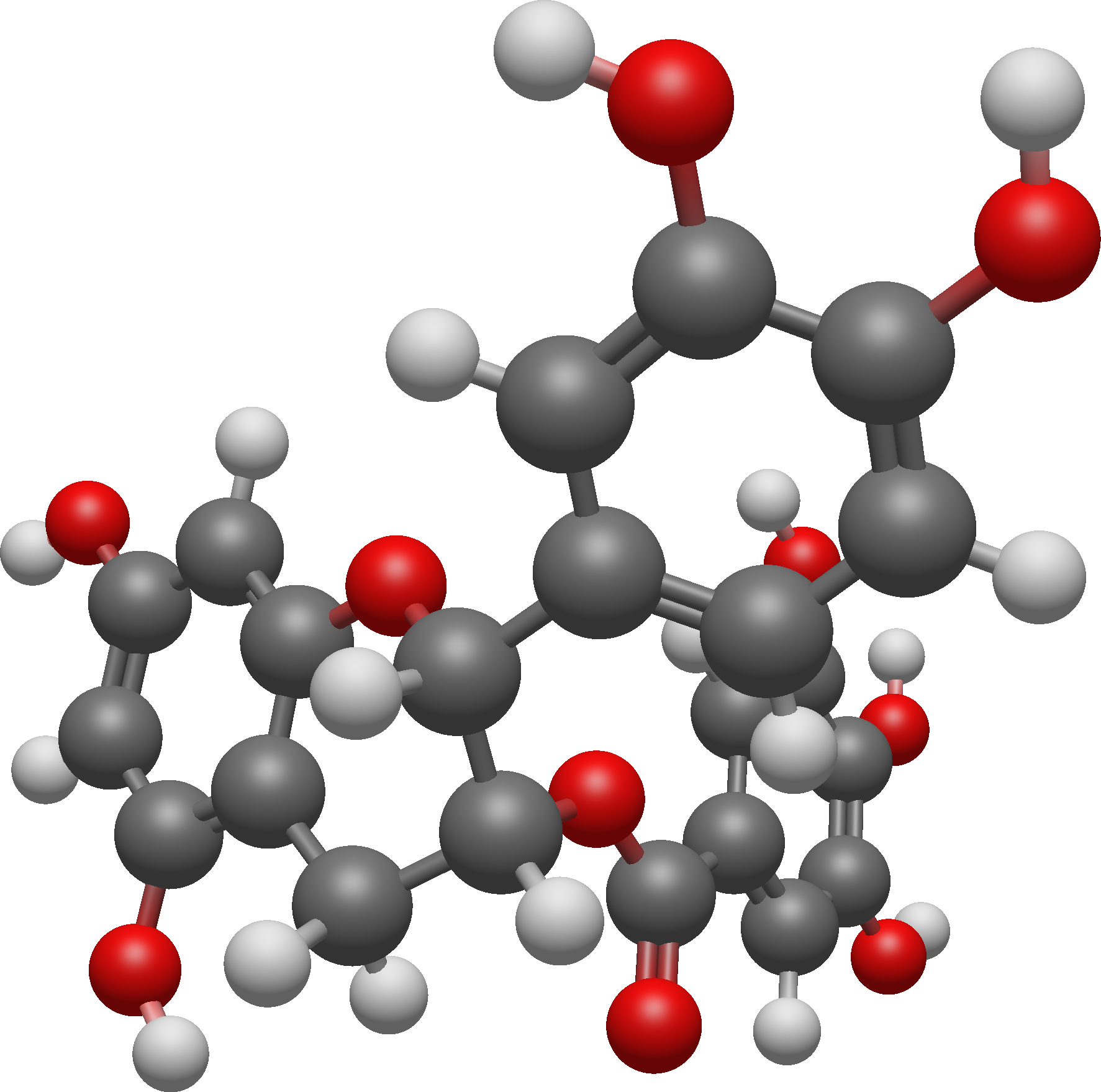
- Chemical structure of epicatechin gallate

Names
- IUPAC name (2R,3R)-3′,4′,5,7-Tetrahydroxyflavan-3-yl 3,4,5-trihydroxybenzoate
- Systematic IUPAC name (2R,3R)-2-(3,4-Dihydroxyphenyl)-5,7-dihydroxy-3,4-dihydro-2H-1-benzopyran-3-yl 3,4,5-trihydroxybenzoate
- Other names ECG; Epicatechin 3-gallate (−)-Epicatechin-3-O-gallate

Identifiers
CAS Number	1257–08–5
3D model (JSmol)	Interactive image
ChEBI	CHEBI:70255
ChEMBL	ChEMBL36327
ChemSpider	97034
ECHA InfoCard	100.116.252
EC Number	603-088-4
KEGG	C22594
PubChem CID	107905
UNII	92587OVD8Z
CompTox Dashboard (EPA)	DTXSID70925231
- InChI: InChI=1S/C22H18O10/c23-11-6-14(25)12-8-19(32-22(30)10-4-16(27)20(29)17(28)5-10)21(31-18(12)7-11)9-1-2-13(24)15(26)3-9/h1-7,19,21,23-29H,8H2/t19-,21-/m1/s1 Key: LSHVYAFMTMFKBA-TZIWHRDSSA-N; InChI=1/C22H18O10/c23-11-6-14(25)12-8-19(32-22(30)10-4-16(27)20(29)17(28)5-10)21(31-18(12)7-11)9-1-2-13(24)15(26)3-9/h1-7,19,21,23-29H,8H2/t19-,21-/m1/s1 Key: LSHVYAFMTMFKBA-TZIWHRDSBY
- SMILES: O=C(O[C@@H]2Cc3c(O[C@@H]2c1ccc(O)c(O)c1)cc(O)cc3O)c4cc(O)c(O)c(O)c4

Properties
Chemical formula	C_{22}H_{18}O_{10}
Molar mass	442.37 g/mol
- Except where otherwise noted, data are given for materials in their standard state (at 25 °C [77 °F], 100 kPa). verify (what is ?) Infobox references

Epicatechin gallate (ECG) is a flavan-3-ol, a type of flavonoid, present in green tea. It is also reported in buckwheat and in grape.

The tea component epicatechin gallate is being researched because in vitro experiments showed it can reverse methicillin resistance in bacteria such as Staphylococcus aureus. Nevertheless, the compound is significantly degraded by steeping in boiling water, unlike related catechins.

As a polyphenolic catechin, ECG is formed by the esterification of epicatechin with gallic acid. ECG is studied for its ability to reverse methicillin resistance in Staphylococcus aureus, but it has poor bioavailability and thermal instability in boiling water.

ECG is a flavonoid with a molecular formula of C_{22}H_{18}O_{10} and a molecular weight of 442.4 g/mol. Its structure comprises a flavan-3-ol backbone (epicatechin) esterified with gallic acid at the 3-position, featuring two catechol rings and a trihydroxybenzoate ring with multiple hydroxyl groups. In test tube experiments, the galloyl moiety enhances ECG's radical scavenging compared to epicatechin, with a DPPH assay showing higher antioxidant activity due to the additional hydroxyl groups. ECG is soluble in water, ethanol, and dimethyl sulfoxide, but degrades significantly in boiling water, limiting its stability in tea preparation.

== Tea ==
ECG is a major catechin in green tea, constituting 5–6% of total catechins, alongside epigallocatechin gallate, epigallocatechin, and epicatechin. Its content is lower in black tea due to oxidation into theaflavins during fermentation.

== See also ==
- List of phytochemicals in food
- Green tea extract
