= Anthoxanthin =

Type of flavonoid pigment in plants

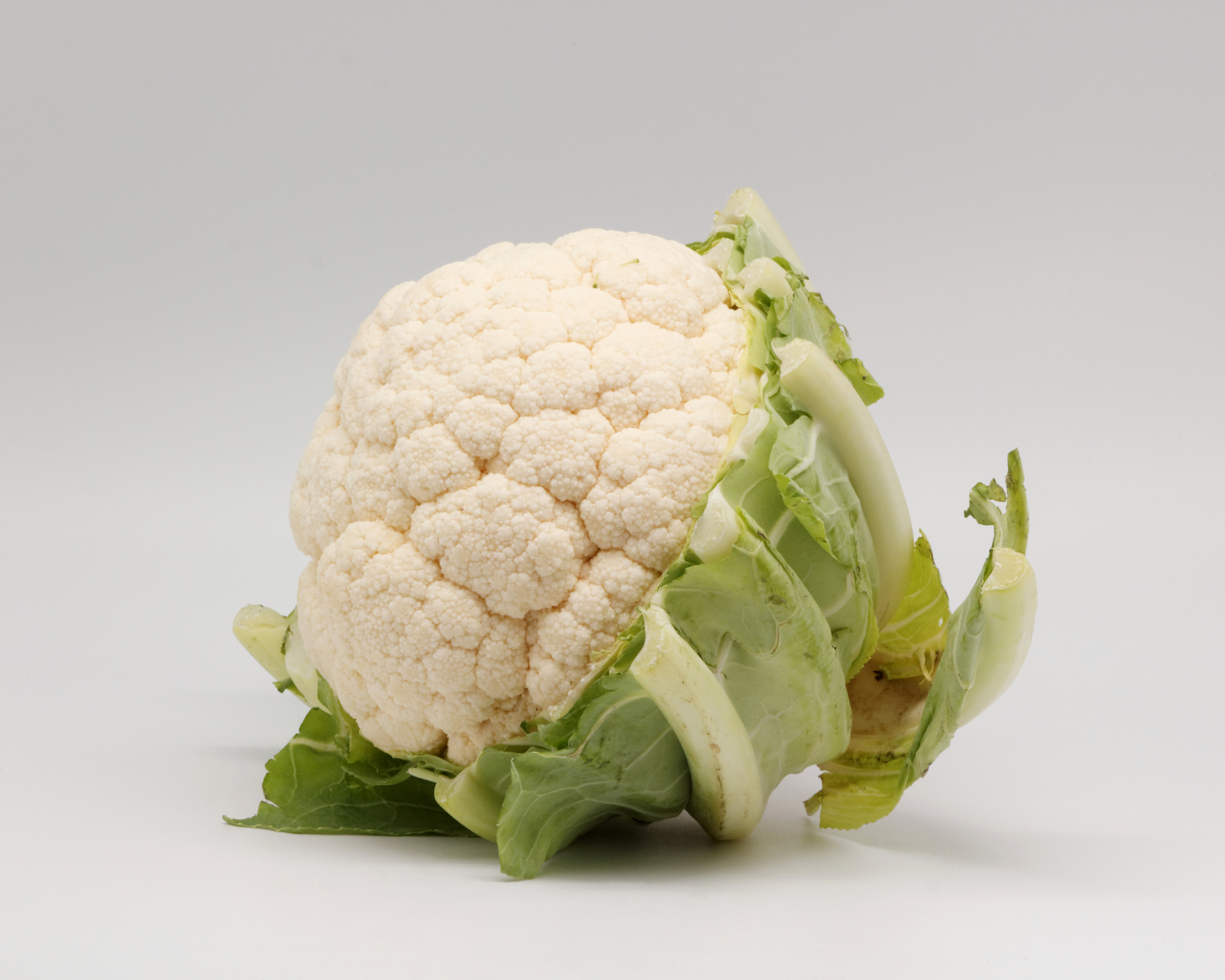
White cauliflower has anthoxanthin pigments

Anthoxanthins (from Ancient Greek ἄνθος (ánthos) 'flower' and ξᾰνθός (xanthós) 'yellow') are a type of flavonoid pigments in plants. Anthoxanthins are water-soluble pigments which range in color from a white or colorless to a creamy to a yellow, often on petals of flowers. These pigments are generally whiter in an acid medium and yellowed in an alkaline medium. They are very susceptible to color changes with minerals and metal ions, similar to anthocyanins. Some examples of anthoxanthins include: apigeniun, luteolin, kaempferol, quercetin.

Anthocyanins are also flavonoids, but their backbone is made of flavylium instead of the flavone and flavonol found in anthoxanthins. As a result, they present a blue color instead of the yellow typical of flavonoids (deriving from the Latin word flavus, meaning yellow). This modification requires a special set of genes to perform, making anthocyanins rarer than anthoxanthins in nature.

== Uses ==
As with all flavonoids, anthoxanthins have antioxidant properties and are important for nutrition. They are sometimes used as food additives to add color or flavor to foods. One of the most well-known anthoxanthins is quercetin, which is found in many fruits and vegetables, including capers, red onions, and kale.

In addition to their use as food additives, anthoxanthins are also used in the production of dyes and pigments. Anthoxanthins can also be used to create yellow, orange, or red dyes for use in textiles, cosmetics, and other products.
