= Theaflavin digallate =

Names
- Systematic IUPAC name 3-Hydroxy-5-oxo-1,8-bis[(2R,3R)-3,5,7-trihydroxy-3,4-dihydro-2H-1-benzopyran-2-yl]-5H-benzo[7]annulene-4,6-diyl bis(3,4,5-trihydroxybenzoate)
- Other names TFDG; TF-3; Theaflavin-3,3'-digallate

Identifiers
CAS Number	33377-72-9
3D model (JSmol)	Interactive image
ChemSpider	20019479
PubChem CID	5748168
CompTox Dashboard (EPA)	DTXSID00905107
- InChI: InChI=1S/C43H32O20/c44-17-7-23(46)21-12-29(52)39(60-32(21)9-17)14-1-19-20(40-30(53)13-22-24(47)8-18(45)10-33(22)61-40)11-31(54)41(63-43(59)16-4-27(50)37(56)28(51)5-16)35(19)38(57)34(6-14)62-42(58)15-2-25(48)36(55)26(49)3-15/h1-11,29-30,39-40,44-56H,12-13H2/t29-,30-,39-,40-/m1/s1 Key: FJYGFTHLNNSVPY-BBXLVSEPSA-N; InChI=1/C43H32O20/c44-17-7-23(46)21-12-29(52)39(60-32(21)9-17)14-1-19-20(40-30(53)13-22-24(47)8-18(45)10-33(22)61-40)11-31(54)41(63-43(59)16-4-27(50)37(56)28(51)5-16)35(19)38(57)34(6-14)62-42(58)15-2-25(48)36(55)26(49)3-15/h1-11,29-30,39-40,44-56H,12-13H2/t29-,30-,39-,40-/m1/s1 Key: FJYGFTHLNNSVPY-BBXLVSEPBI
- SMILES: Oc1cc(cc(O)c1O)C(=O)Oc5c(O)cc([C@H]2Oc3cc(O)cc(O)c3C[C@H]2O)c6\C=C(/C=C(/OC(=O)c4cc(O)c(O)c(O)c4)C(=O)c56)[C@H]7Oc8cc(O)cc(O)c8C[C@H]7O

Properties
Chemical formula	C_{43}H_{32}O_{20}
Molar mass	868.709 g·mol^{−1}
- Except where otherwise noted, data are given for materials in their standard state (at 25 °C [77 °F], 100 kPa). verify (what is ?) Infobox references

Theaflavin digallate (TFDG) is an antioxidant natural phenol found in black tea, and a theaflavin derivative.

== Health ==
- TFDG is a scavenger of superoxide in vitro, even more so than EGCG.
- Tea polyphenols including TFDG reduce angiogenesis, which is implicated in non-liquid cancers, an area of intense current research, by decreasing vascular endothelial growth factor production and receptor phosphorylation.
- TFDG inhibits activity of the enzyme 3CLpro in vitro.
