= Phytochemical =

Chemical compounds produced by plants

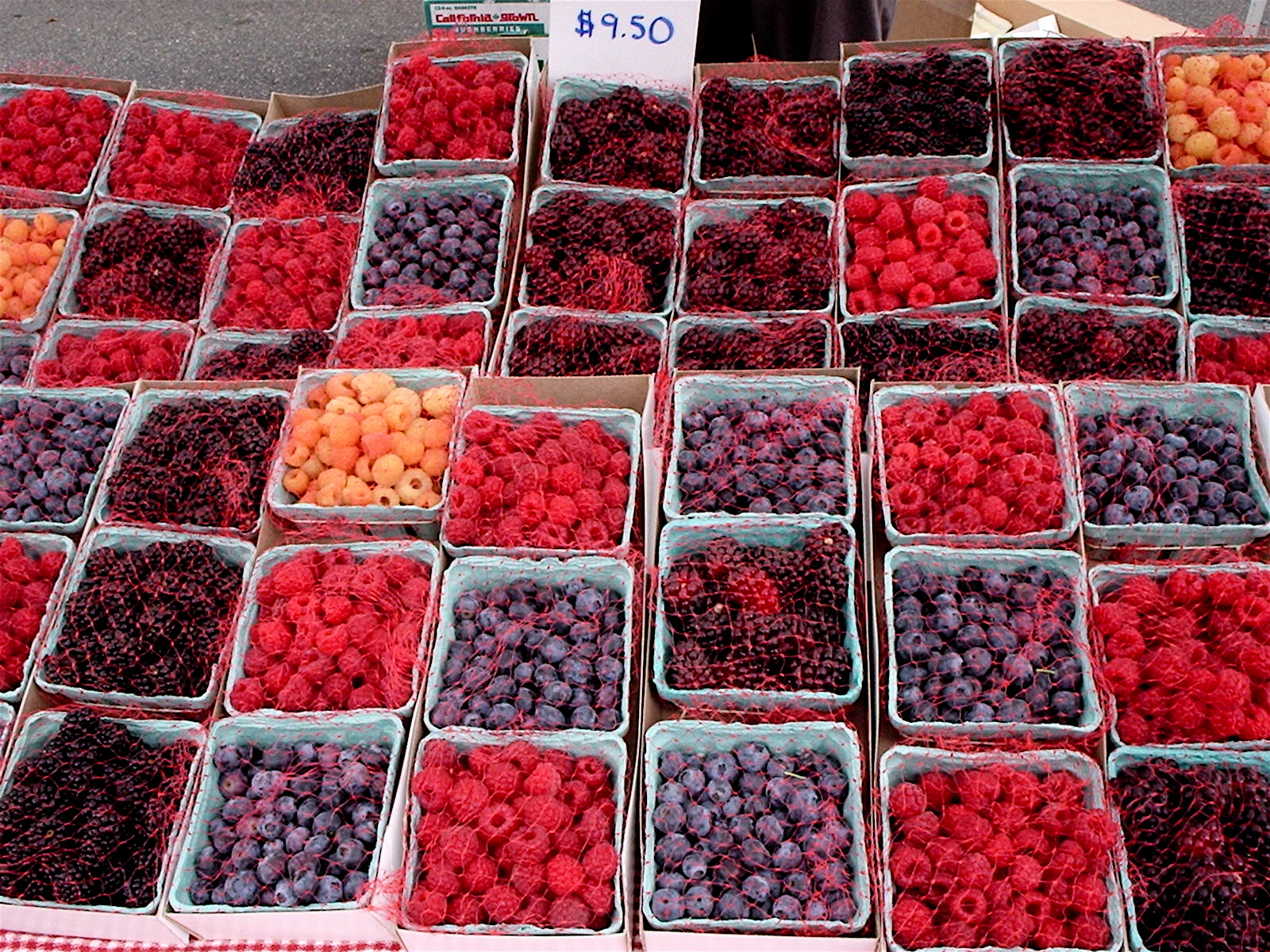
Red, blue, and purple colors of berries derive mainly from polyphenol phytochemicals called anthocyanins.

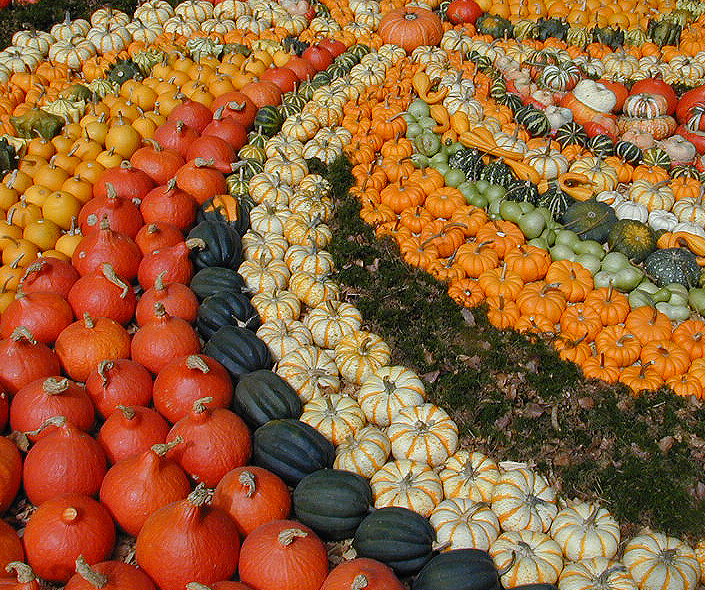
Cucurbita fruits, including squash and pumpkin, typically have high content of the phytochemical pigments called carotenoids.

Phytochemicals are naturally occurring chemicals present in or extracted from plants. Some phytochemicals are nutrients for the plant, while others are metabolites produced to enhance plant survivability and reproduction.

The fields of extracting phytochemicals for manufactured products or applying scientific methods to study phytochemical properties are called phytochemistry. An individual who uses phytochemicals in food chemistry manufacturing or research is a phytochemist.

The term phytochemical does not generally imply that there is any biological activity or health benefit following its consumption. Once phytochemicals in a food enter the digestion process, the fate of individual phytochemicals in the body is unknown due to extensive metabolism of the food in the gastrointestinal tract, producing phytochemical metabolites with different biological properties from those of the parent compound that may have been tested in vitro. Further, the bioavailability of many phytochemical metabolites appears to be low, as they are rapidly excreted from the body, sometimes within minutes. Other than for dietary fiber, no non-nutrient phytochemicals have sufficient scientific evidence for providing a health benefit.

Some ingested phytochemicals may be toxic, and some may be used in cosmetics, drug discovery, or traditional medicine.

== Etymology ==
Phytochemical is derived from compounding phyto (from phytón, the Ancient Greek word for plant) with chemical, as first used in English for plant chemistry and organic chemistry around 1850.

== Definition ==
Phytochemicals are chemicals produced by plants through primary or secondary metabolism. They generally have biological activity in the plant host and play a role in plant growth or defense against competitors, pathogens, or predators. As components of plants, all individual phytochemicals make up the whole plant as it exists in nature.

Phytochemicals are generally regarded as research compounds rather than essential nutrients because proof of their possible health effects has not been established yet. Phytochemicals under research may be classified into major categories, such as carotenoids and polyphenols, which include phenolic acids, flavonoids, stilbenes, or lignans. Flavonoids may be further divided into groups based on their similar chemical structure, such as anthocyanins, flavones, flavanones, isoflavones, and flavanols. Flavanols are further classified as catechins, epicatechins, and proanthocyanidins. In total, between 50,000 and 130,000 phytochemicals have been discovered.

Phytochemists study phytochemicals by first extracting and isolating compounds from the origin plant, followed by defining their structure or testing in laboratory model systems, such as in vitro studies or in vivo studies using laboratory animals. Scientific challenges in that field include isolating specific compounds and determining their structures, which are often complex, and identifying what specific phytochemical is primarily responsible for any given biological activity.

Further, upon consuming phytochemicals in a food entering the digestion process, the fate of individual phytochemicals in the body is unknown due to extensive metabolism in the gastrointestinal tract, producing smaller phytochemical metabolites with different biological properties from those of the parent compound, and with low bioavailability and rapid excretion. Other than for dietary fiber, no non-nutrient phytochemical has sufficient scientific evidence in humans for an approved health claim.

== History of uses ==
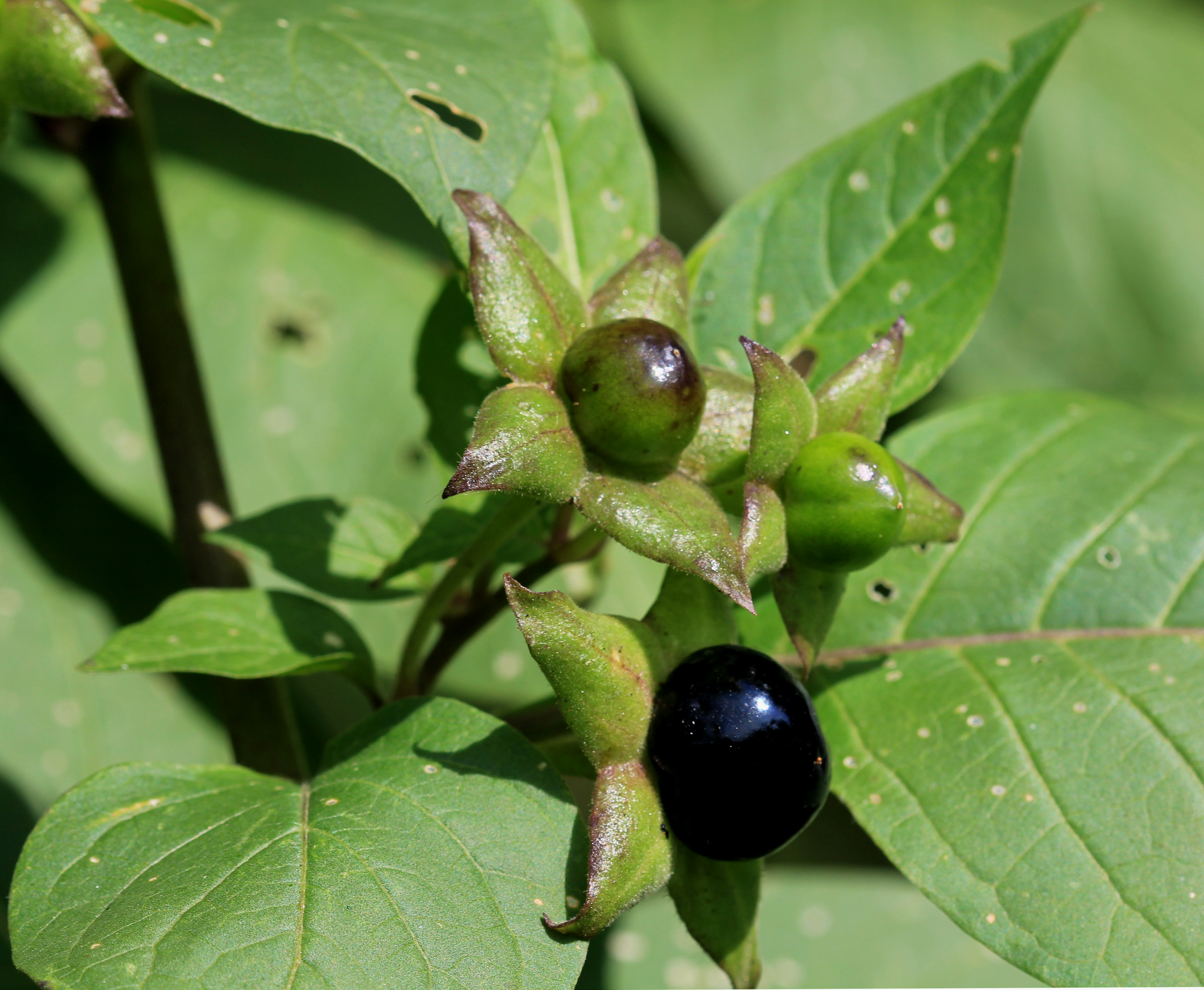
Berries of Atropa belladonna, also called deadly nightshade, containing the toxic phytochemicals, tropane alkaloids

Without specific knowledge of their cellular actions or mechanisms, phytochemicals are used in traditional medicine (although some may be toxic). For example, salicin, having anti-inflammatory and pain-relieving properties, was originally extracted from the bark of the white willow tree that was prescribed in folk medicine. Later, it was synthetically produced to become the common, over-the-counter drug, aspirin.

The tropane alkaloids of Atropa belladonna were used as poisons, and early humans made poisonous arrows from the plant. Other uses include perfumes, such as the sesquiterpene santolols, from sandalwood.

The English yew tree was long known to be extremely and immediately toxic to animals that grazed on its leaves or to children who ate its berries; however, in 1971, paclitaxel was isolated from it, subsequently becoming a cancer drug.

== Functions ==
The biological activities for most phytochemicals are unknown or poorly understood, in isolation or as part of foods. Phytochemicals with established roles in the body are classified as essential nutrients.

The phytochemical category includes compounds recognized as essential nutrients that are naturally contained in plants and are required for normal physiological functions, so must be obtained from the diet in humans.

Some phytochemicals are known phytotoxins that are toxic to humans; for example, aristolochic acid is carcinogenic at low doses.

Some phytochemicals are antinutrients that interfere with the absorption of nutrients. Others, such as some polyphenols and flavonoids, may be pro-oxidants in high ingested amounts. Non-digestible dietary fibers from plant foods, often considered as a phytochemical, are generally regarded as a nutrient group having approved health claims for reducing the risk of some types of cancer and coronary heart disease.

Phytochemical dietary supplements are neither recommended by health authorities for improving health, nor are they approved by regulatory agencies for health claims on product labels.

== Consumer and industry guidance ==
While health authorities encourage consumers to eat diets rich in fruit, vegetables, whole grains, legumes, and nuts to improve and maintain health, evidence that such effects result from specific, non-nutrient phytochemicals is limited or absent. For example, systematic reviews and/or meta-analyses indicate weak or no evidence for phytochemicals from plant food consumption having an effect on breast, lung, or bladder cancers. Further, in the United States, regulations exist to limit the language on product labels for how plant food consumption may affect cancers, excluding mention of any phytochemical or nutrient except for those with established health benefits against cancer, such as dietary fiber, vitamin A, and vitamin C.

Phytochemicals, such as polyphenols, have been specifically discouraged from food labeling in Europe and the United States because there is no scientifically proven evidence for a cause-and-effect relationship between dietary polyphenols and inhibition or prevention of any disease.

Among carotenoids such as the tomato phytochemical, lycopene, the U.S. Food and Drug Administration found insufficient evidence for its effects on any of several cancer types, resulting in limited language for how products containing lycopene may be described on labels.

== Effects of food processing ==
Phytochemicals in freshly harvested plant foods may be degraded by processing techniques, including cooking. The main cause of phytochemical loss from cooking is thermal decomposition.

The opposite exists in the case of carotenoids, such as lycopene present in tomatoes, which may remain stable or increase in content from cooking, due to liberation from cellular membranes in the cooked food.

Food processing techniques such as mechanical processing also may free carotenoids and other phytochemicals from the food matrix, increasing dietary intake.

In some cases, processing of food is necessary to remove phytotoxins or antinutrients. For example, societies that use cassava as a staple have traditional preparation practices that involve some processing (soaking, cooking, fermentation), which are necessary to avoid illness from cyanogenic glycosides present in unprocessed cassava.

== See also ==
- Allelopathy
- List of antioxidants in food
- List of phytochemicals in food
- Nutrition
- Secondary metabolites
