= 3-Methoxy-4-hydroxyhippuric acid =

- Chemical structure of 3-methoxy-4-hydroxyhippuric acid

Names
- IUPAC name N-(4-Hydroxy-3-methoxybenzoyl)glycine
- Systematic IUPAC name (4-Hydroxy-3-methoxybenzamido)acetic acid
- Other names Vanilloylglycine

Identifiers
CAS Number	1212-04-0
3D model (JSmol)	Interactive image
ChEBI	CHEBI:89556
ChemSpider	2340857
PubChem CID	3083688
UNII	82F2E8I1NJ
CompTox Dashboard (EPA)	DTXSID50153176
- InChI: InChI=1S/C10H11NO5/c1-16-8-4-6(2-3-7(8)12)10(15)11-5-9(13)14/h2-4,12H,5H2,1H3,(H,11,15)(H,13,14) Key: LOODYTDRRBLQNH-UHFFFAOYSA-N
- SMILES: COc1cc(C(=O)NCC(=O)O)ccc1O

Properties
Chemical formula	C_{10}H_{11}NO_{5}
Molar mass	225.19 g/mol
- Except where otherwise noted, data are given for materials in their standard state (at 25 °C [77 °F], 100 kPa). verify (what is ?) Infobox references

3-Methoxy-4-hydroxyhippuric acid is one of the main catechins metabolites found in humans after consumption of green tea infusions.

== See also ==
- Hippuric acid
