= Theaflavin-3-gallate =

Names
- Systematic IUPAC name (2R,3R)-5,7-Dihydroxy-2-{3,4,6-trihydroxy-5-oxo-8-[(2R,3R)-3,5,7-trihydroxy-3,4-dihydro-2H-1-benzopyran-2-yl]-5H-benzo[7]annulen-2-yl}-3,4-dihydro-2H-1-benzopyran-3-yl 3,4,5-trihydroxybenzoate
- Other names Theaflavin-3-monogallate; Theaflavin monogallate A; Theaflavin 2A; TFMG

Identifiers
| CAS Number | 30462-34-1 |
| 3D model (JSmol) | Interactive image |
| ChEMBL | ChEMBL3039319 |
| ChemSpider | 147959 |
| PubChem CID | 169167 |
| UNII | S6469PF6TK |
| CompTox Dashboard (EPA) | DTXSID30951233 |
- InChI: InChI=1S/C36H28O16/c37-14-5-20(39)18-10-26(45)35(51-27(18)7-14)17-9-25(44)33(48)30-16(17)1-12(2-24(43)32(30)47)34-29(11-19-21(40)6-15(38)8-28(19)50-34)52-36(49)13-3-22(41)31(46)23(42)4-13/h1-9,26,29,34-35,37-42,44-46,48H,10-11H2,(H,43,47)/t26-,29-,34-,35-/m1/s1 Key: KMJPKUVSXFVQGZ-WQLSNUALSA-N
- SMILES: c1c(cc(=O)c(c2c1c(cc(c2O)O)[C@@H]3[C@@H](Cc4c(cc(cc4O3)O)O)O)O)[C@@H]5[C@@H](Cc6c(cc(cc6O5)O)O)OC(=O)c7cc(c(c(c7)O)O)O

Properties
| Chemical formula | C_{36}H_{28}O_{16} |
| Molar mass | 716.604 g·mol^{−1} |
- Except where otherwise noted, data are given for materials in their standard state (at 25 °C [77 °F], 100 kPa). verify (what is ?) Infobox references

Theaflavin-3-gallate is a theaflavin derivative. It can be found in abundance in black tea and is produced during fermentation. It has been studied as a cancer-fighting chemical when combined with cisplatin against ovarian cancer cells. Consuming large amounts of black tea has been reported to reduce the effects of aging in female populations.

== See also ==
- List of phytochemicals in food
