= Isoflavane =

Isoflavan backbone of the isoflavanes

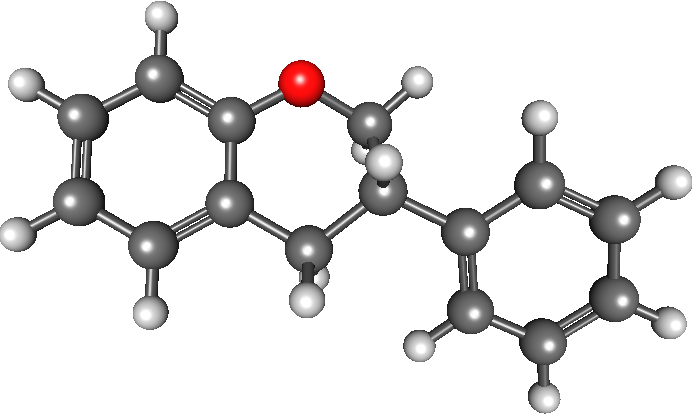
Isoflavan backbone of the isoflavanes

Isoflavanes are a class of isoflavonoids, which are themselves types of polyphenolic compounds. They have the 3-phenylchroman (isoflavan, CAS number: 4737-26-2, molecular formula: C_{15}H_{14}O, exact mass: 210.1044646 u) backbone.

== Examples ==
- Equol

== Sources ==
Skeletal formula of lonchocarpane (R=OMe) or laxiflorane (R=H)

Philenoptera laxiflora (syn. Lonchocarpus laxiflorus) contains two isoflavanes: lonchocarpane and laxiflorane.

== See also ==
- Isoflavonoid
