= Isoflavene =

Class of chemical compounds

Glabrene

2-Methoxyjudaicin

Haginin D

Isoflavenes are a type of isoflavonoids.

== Examples ==
- Glabrene, found in the roots of liquorice, is also a xenoestrogen.
- 2-Methoxyjudaicin found in the roots of Cicer bijugum
- Haginin D
- Idronoxil, also known as phenoxodiol, which is used for anticancer purposes.
