= Flavan-3-ol =

Category of polyphenol compound

Chemical structure of flavan-3-ol

Flavan-3-ols (sometimes referred to as flavanols) are a subgroup of flavonoids. They are derivatives of flavans, are structurally diverse, and include compounds such as catechins (e.g. epigallocatechin gallate), epicatechin gallate, proanthocyanidins, theaflavins, and thearubigins.

Present in tea leaves, berries, apples, cocoa beans, and grapes, they participate in diverse plant functions, including regulation of cell growth, attraction of pollinating insects, and defense against environmental stress.

== Chemical structure ==
Flavanols exist both as monomers (catechins) and as polymers (proanthocyanidins). The single-molecule (monomer) catechin, or isomer epicatechin (see diagram), adds four hydroxyls to flavan-3-ol, making building blocks for polymers (proanthocyanidins) and higher order polymers (anthocyanidins).

Flavan-3-ols possess two chiral carbons, meaning four diastereoisomers occur for each of them. They are distinguished from the yellow, ketone-containing flavonoids, such as quercetin. Catechin monomers, dimers, and trimers (oligomers) are colorless, while higher order polymers, anthocyanidins, exhibit deepening reds and become tannins.

Catechin and epicatechin are epimers, with (–)-epicatechin and (+)-catechin being the most common optical isomers of flavanols found in nature. Catechin was first isolated from the plant extract, catechu, from which it derives its name.

Epigallocatechin and gallocatechin contain an additional phenolic hydroxyl group when compared to epicatechin and catechin, respectively.

Catechin gallates are gallic acid esters of the catechins; an example is epigallocatechin gallate, the most abundant catechin in tea. Proanthocyanidins and thearubigins are also in the flavan-3-ol subclass.

In contrast to many other flavonoids, flavan-3-ols do not generally exist as glycosides in plants.

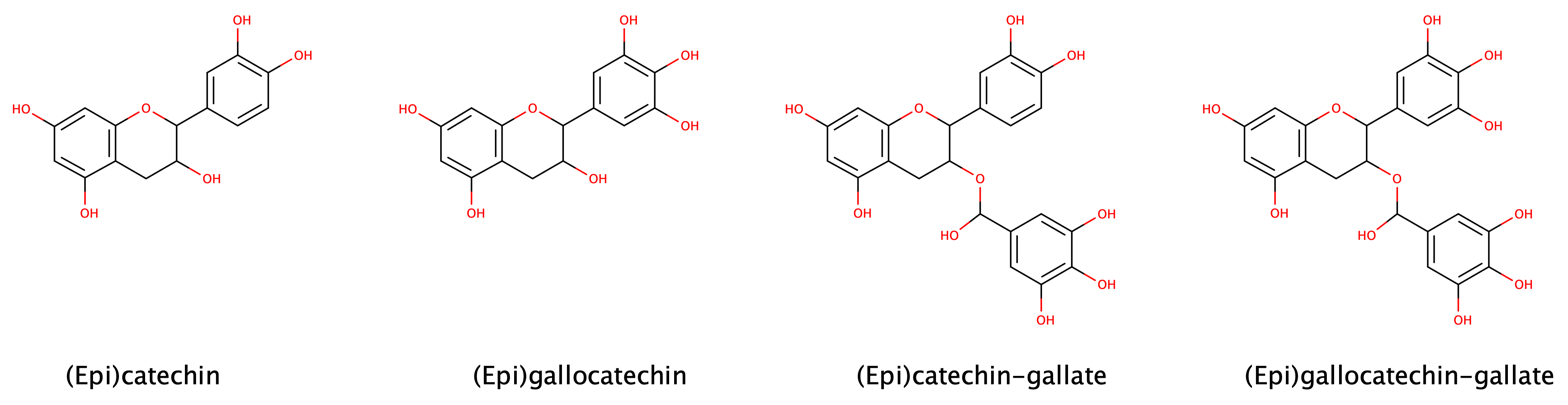
Structures of (epi)catechin, (epi)catechin gallate, (epi)gallocatechin and (epi)gallocatechin gallate.

=== Biosynthesis of (–)-epicatechin ===
The flavonoids are derived from phenylalanine and malonyl-coenzyme A in reactions catalyzed by polyketide synthase. Chain extension of 4-hydroxycinnamoyl-CoA with three molecules of malonyl-CoA gives initially a polyketide (figure), which can be folded, allowing Claisen-like reactions to occur, generating aromatic rings. Fluorescence-lifetime imaging microscopy can be used to detect flavanols in plant cells.

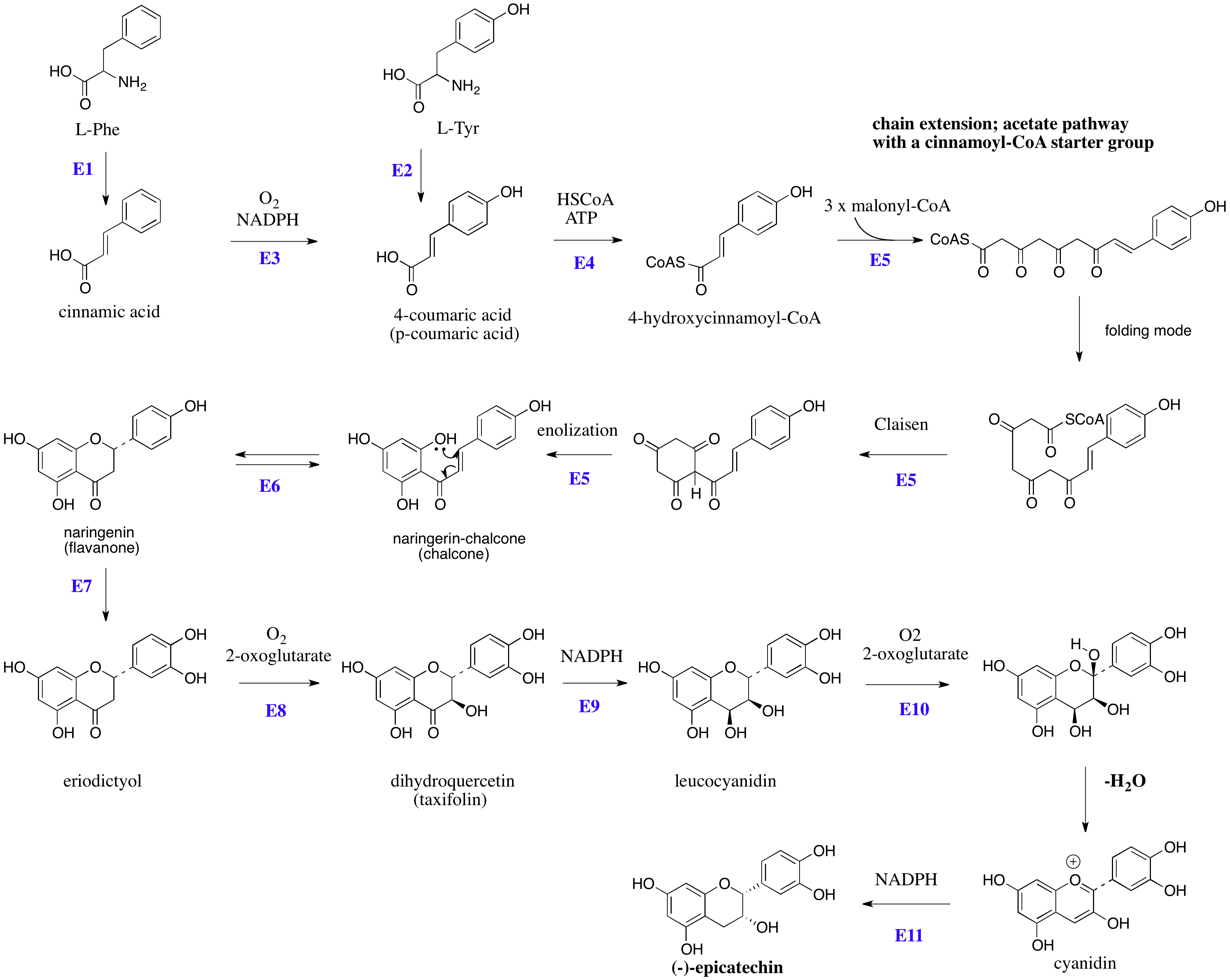

Schematic overview of the flavan-3-ol (–)-epicatechin biosynthesis from tyrosine (Tyr) or phenylalanine (Phe) in plants. Enzymes are indicated in blue, abbreviated as follows:

- E1: phenylalanine ammonia lyase
- E2: tyrosine ammonia lyase
- E3: cinnamate 4-hydroxylase
- E4: 4-coumaroyl:CoA-ligase
- E5: chalcone synthase (naringenin-chalcone synthase)
- E6: chalcone isomerase
- E7: flavonoid 3′-hydroxylase
- E8: flavanone 3-hydroxylase
- E9: dihydroflavanol 4-reductase
- E10: anthocyanidin synthase (leucoanthocyanidin dioxygenase)
- E11: anthocyanidin reductase

=== Aglycones ===
Flavan-3-ols
Image	Name	Formula	Oligomers
(+)-Catechin	Catechin, C, (+)-Catechin	C_{15}H_{14}O_{6}	Procyanidins
Epicatechin	Epicatechin, EC, (–)-Epicatechin (cis)	C_{15}H_{14}O_{6}	Procyanidins
Epigallocatechin	Epigallocatechin, EGC	C_{15}H_{14}O_{7}	Prodelphinidins
Epicatechin gallate	Epicatechin gallate, ECG	C_{22}H_{18}O_{10}	
Epigallocatechin gallate	Epigallocatechin gallate, EGCG, (–)-Epigallocatechin gallate	C_{22}H_{18}O_{11}	
Epiafzelechin	Epiafzelechin	C_{15}H_{14}O_{5}	
Fisetinidol	Fisetinidol	C_{15}H_{14}O_{5}	
Guibourtinidol	Guibourtinidol	C_{15}H_{14}O_{4}	Proguibourtinidins
Mesquitol	Mesquitol	C_{15}H_{14}O_{6}	
Robinetinidol	Robinetinidol	C_{15}H_{14}O_{6}	Prorobinetinidins

== Dietary sources ==
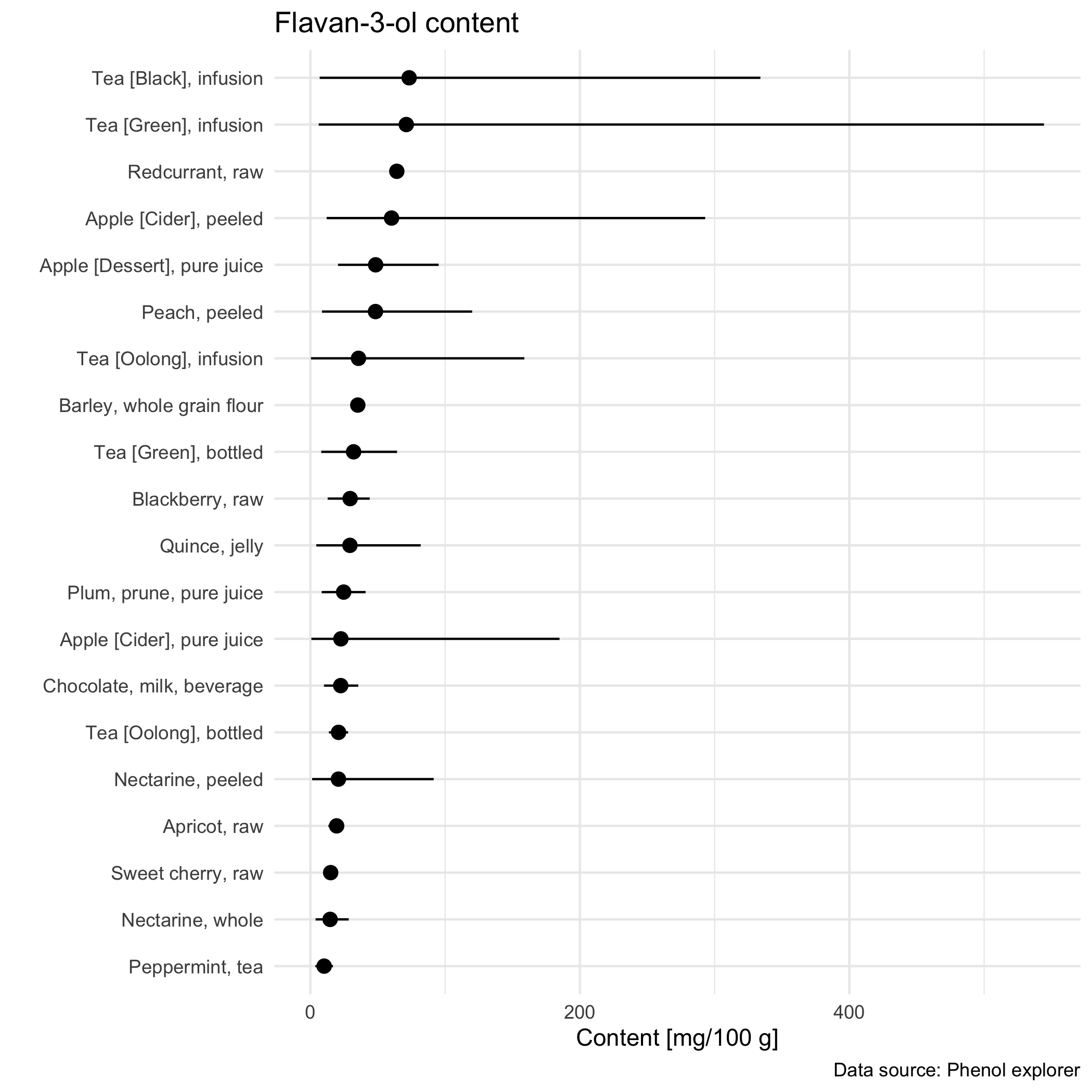
Reported range of flavan-3-ol content in foods commonly consumed.

Flavan-3-ols are abundant in teas derived from the tea plant Camellia sinensis, in particular green tea. Apart from tea, main sources in the human diet are chocolate, pome fruits, and berries and their products, such as juices or red wine. Their content in food is highly variable and affected by various factors, such as cultivar, processing and preparation. Tea extracts are sold as dietary supplements labeled as tea catechins or tea polyphenols. Green tea extracts typically have higher levels of catechins, while black tea extracts have high levels of theaflavins and thearubigins.

While cocoa beans (the seeds of Theobroma cacao) contain flavan-3-ols, these are susceptible to heat degradation during processing, causing the flavanol content in cocoa products, such as chocolate, to be relatively low. The bioavailability can be affected by nutrient-nutrient interactions with foods containing polyphenol oxidase.

== Bioavailability and metabolism ==
The bioavailability of flavan-3-ols depends on the food matrix, type of compound and their stereochemical configuration. While monomeric flavan-3-ols are readily taken up, oligomeric forms are not absorbed. Most data for human metabolism of flavan-3-ols are available for monomeric compounds, especially epicatechin. These compounds are taken up and metabolized upon uptake in the small intestine, mainly by O-methylation and glucuronidation, and then further metabolized by the liver. The colonic microbiome also has a role in the metabolism of flavan-3-ols, which are catabolized to smaller compounds.

== Possible adverse effects ==
As catechins, in particular epigallocatechin gallate, in green tea extract can be hepatotoxic, Health Canada and EFSA have advised for caution, recommending intake from supplements should not exceed 800 milligrams (mg) per day.

== Research ==
Research has shown that flavan-3-ols may affect vascular function, blood pressure, and blood lipids, with only minor effects demonstrated, as of 2019.

As of 2022, food-based evidence indicates that intake of 400–600 mg per day of flavan-3-ols – up to twice the normal dietary intake of flavanols by European adults – could have a small positive effect on cardiovascular biomarkers.

== Regulation ==
In 2015, the European Commission approved a health claim for cocoa flavanols, stating that an intake of 200 mg per day "may contribute to maintenance of vascular elasticity and normal blood flow".

In 2023, the US Food and Drug Administration assessed a health claim for consuming 200 mg per day of cocoa powder flavanols, stating in a letter of enforcement discretion that "there is very limited credible scientific evidence for a qualified health claim for cocoa flavanols in high flavanol cocoa powder and a reduced risk of cardiovascular disease". Reasons for this assessment included a small number of credible studies, questionable methodology, inadequate number of subjects, short study duration, and poor replication and inconsistency of results.

The letter of enforcement discretion further stated that the evidence "does not support the establishment of a daily intake of 200 mg of cocoa flavanols or any other daily dietary intake recommendation levels for the general U.S. population."

== Gallery ==
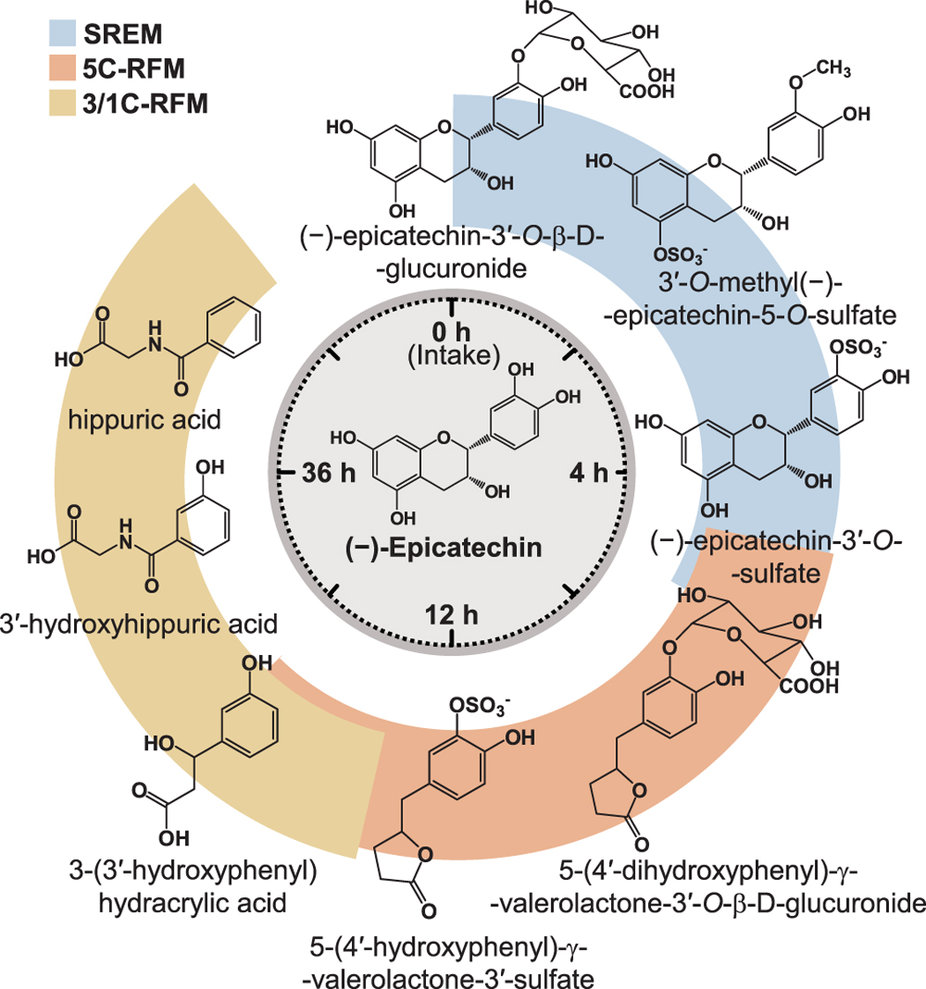
Schematic representation of the flavan-3-ol (−)-epicatechin metabolism in humans as a function of time post-oral intake. SREM: structurally related (−)-epicatechin metabolites. 5C-RFM: 5-carbon ring fission metabolites. 3/1C-RFM: 3- and 1-carbon-side chain ring fission metabolites. The structures of the most abundant (−)-epicatechin metabolites present in the systemic circulation and in urine are depicted.

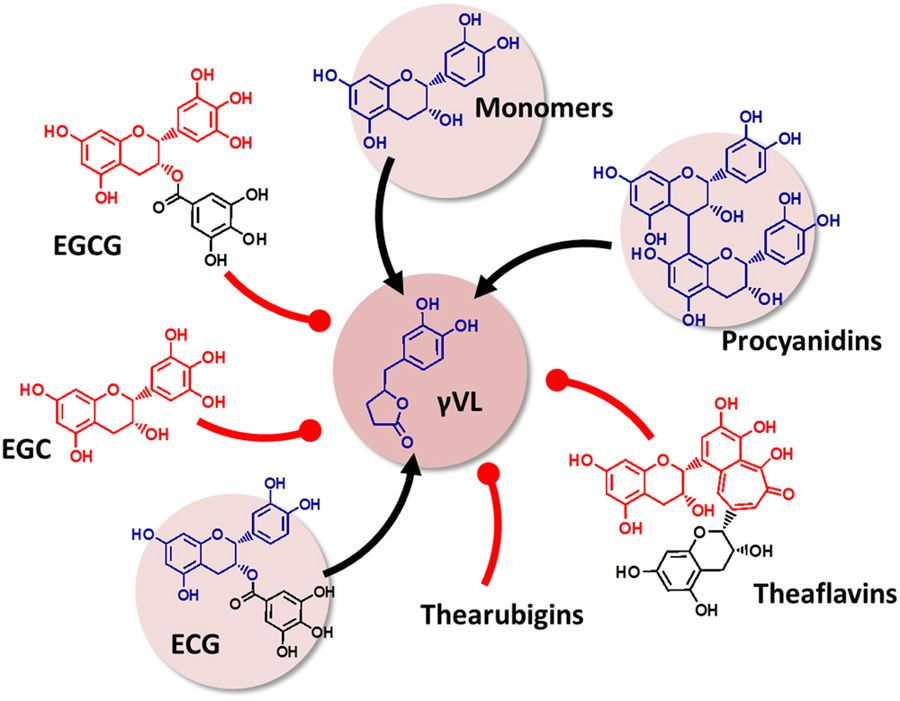
Flavan-3-ol precursors of the microbial metabolite 5-(3′/4′-dihydroxyphenyl)-γ-valerolactone (γVL). Only compounds with intact (epi)catechin moiety result in the formation of γVL by the intestinal microbiome. ECG, (−)-epicatechin-3-O-gallate; EGCG, Epigallocatechin gallate; EGC, Epigallocatechin.
