= Thearubigin =

Organic polymers group

Chemical structure of an example of a thearubigin

Thearubigins are polymeric polyphenols (flavan-3-ols) that are formed during the enzymatic oxidation and condensation of two gallocatechins (epigallocatechin and epigallocatechin gallate) with the participation of polyphenol oxidases during the fermentation reactions in black tea. Thearubigins are red in color and are responsible for much of the staining effect of tea. Therefore, a black (fully oxidized) tea often appears red while a green or white tea has a much clearer appearance. The color of black tea, however, is affected by many other factors as well, such as the amount of theaflavins, another oxidized form of polyphenols.

Thearubigins were first studied by Roberts, E. A. H. in the 1960s by the means of spectroscopy or by fractionation or paper chromatography. They have been identified as proanthocyanidins in 1969. Thearubigin formation was studied in an in vitro model in 1983, showing that the in vitro model used was a possible proxy for in vivo oxidation, which would allow further study under controlled conditions.

The structure of thearubigins was studied by degradation in 1996, showing that "thearubigins are ... polymers of flavan-3-ol and flavan-3-ol gallates". Quantification methods were based on Porter's assay in 1995 and separation made on C18 sorbent cartridges in 1992.

New structures like theacitrin and theasinensins A and B were proposed in 1997 and in 2003, respectively. Further studies made use of MALDI-TOF mass spectrometry in 2004 and other techniques in 2010. It was shown in 2009 that thearubigin formation in black tea is correlated with catechin depletion.
