= Tangeretin =

Tangeretin (Tangeritin)

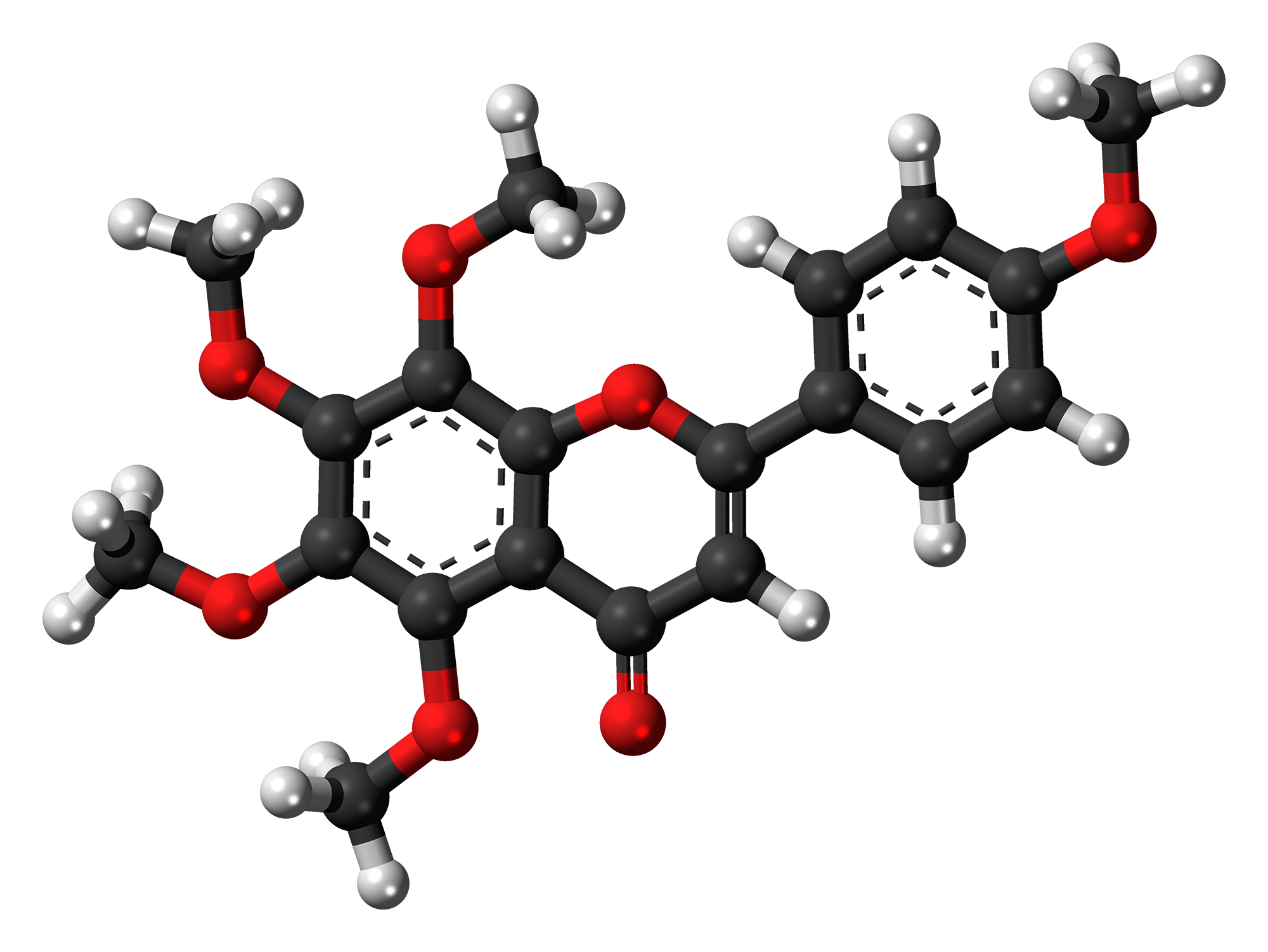

Names
- IUPAC name 4′,5,6,7,8-Pentamethoxyflavone
- Systematic IUPAC name 5,6,7,8-Tetramethoxy-2-(4-methoxyphenyl)-4H-1-benzopyran-4-one

Identifiers
CAS Number	481-53-8
3D model (JSmol)	Interactive image
ChEBI	CHEBI:9400
ChemSpider	61389
ECHA InfoCard	100.006.883
EC Number	207-570-1
KEGG	C10190
PubChem CID	68077
UNII	I4TLA1DLX6
CompTox Dashboard (EPA)	DTXSID30197417
- InChI: InChI=1S/C20H20O7/c1-22-12-8-6-11(7-9-12)14-10-13(21)15-16(23-2)18(24-3)20(26-5)19(25-4)17(15)27-14/h6-10H,1-5H3 Key: ULSUXBXHSYSGDT-UHFFFAOYSA-N; InChI=1/C20H20O7/c1-22-12-8-6-11(7-9-12)14-10-13(21)15-16(23-2)18(24-3)20(26-5)19(25-4)17(15)27-14/h6-10H,1-5H3 Key: ULSUXBXHSYSGDT-UHFFFAOYAG
- SMILES: O=C2C1=C(OC)C(OC)=C(OC)C(OC)=C1OC(C3=CC=C(OC)C=C3)=C2

Properties
Chemical formula	C_{20}H_{20}O_{7}
Molar mass	372.37 g/mol
Density	1.244 ± 0.06 g/cm^{3}
Melting point	155 to 156 °C (311 to 313 °F; 428 to 429 K)
Boiling point	565.3 ± 50.0 °C (1,049.5 ± 90.0 °F; 838.4 ± 50.0 K)
Solubility in water	0.037 g/L
- Except where otherwise noted, data are given for materials in their standard state (at 25 °C [77 °F], 100 kPa). verify (what is ?) Infobox references

Tangeretin is an O-polymethoxylated flavone that is found in tangerine and other citrus peels. Tangeretin strengthens the cell wall and acts as a plant's defensive mechanism against disease-causing pathogens.

It has also been used as a marker compound to detect contamination in citrus juices.

The following is a list of methods used to extract tangeretin from citrus peels:

- column chromatography
- preparative-high performance liquid chromatography
- super critical fluid chromatography
- high speed counter current chromatography
- a combination of vacuum flash silica gel chromatography and flash C_{8} column chromatography
- flash chromatography
- isolation using ionic liquids and a cycle of centrifugation and decantation

The low solubility of Tangeretin is one of the main reasons for the low bioavailability of Tangeretin (and other flavonoids in general), and has been reported as a major challenge when using the compound in laboratory procedures. However, methods for tangeretin extraction are currently being tested to maximize efficiency and percent yields as its uses in treatment of cancer and other diseases are becoming better understood.

Tangeretin is commercially available as a dietary supplement. Tangeretin has also demonstrated beneficial applications in other pharmaceutical, nutraceutical, and cosmetic processes.

Tangeretin can be found as various synonyms throughout literature and research, including Tangeritin and 5,6,7,8,4’-pentamethoxyflavone (VIII).
