= Flavone =

Names
- IUPAC name Flavone
- Systematic IUPAC name 2-Phenyl-4H-1-benzopyran-4-one; 2-Phenyl-4H-chromen-4-one

Identifiers
CAS Number	525-82-6
3D model (JSmol)	Interactive image
Beilstein Reference	157598
ChEBI	CHEBI:42491
ChEMBL	ChEMBL275638
ChemSpider	10230
DrugBank	DB07776
ECHA InfoCard	100.007.623
EC Number	208-383-8
Gmelin Reference	1224858
IUPHAR/BPS	409
KEGG	C15608
PubChem CID	10680
RTECS number	DJ3100630
UNII	S2V45N7G3B
CompTox Dashboard (EPA)	DTXSID2022048
- InChI: InChI=1S/C15H10O2/c16-13-10-15(11-6-2-1-3-7-11)17-14-9-5-4-8-12(13)14/h1-10H Key: VHBFFQKBGNRLFZ-UHFFFAOYSA-N
- SMILES: C1=CC=C(C=C1)C2=CC(=O)C3=CC=CC=C3O2

Properties
Chemical formula	C_{15}H_{10}O_{2}
Molar mass	222.243 g·mol^{−1}
Appearance	white solid
Melting point	96–97 °C (205–207 °F; 369–370 K)
- Except where otherwise noted, data are given for materials in their standard state (at 25 °C [77 °F], 100 kPa). Infobox references

Flavone is an organic compound with the formula C_{6}H_{4}OC_{3}H(Ph)O. A white solid, flavone is a derivative of chromone with a phenyl (Ph) substituent adjacent to the ether group. The compound is of little direct practical importance, but substituted derivatives, the flavones and flavonoids are a large class of nutritionally important natural products. Flavone can be prepared in the laboratory by cyclization of 2-hydroxacetophenone. Isomeric with flavone is isoflavone, where the phenyl group is adjacent to the ketone.
