= Epigallocatechin gallate =

Catechin (polyphenol) in tea

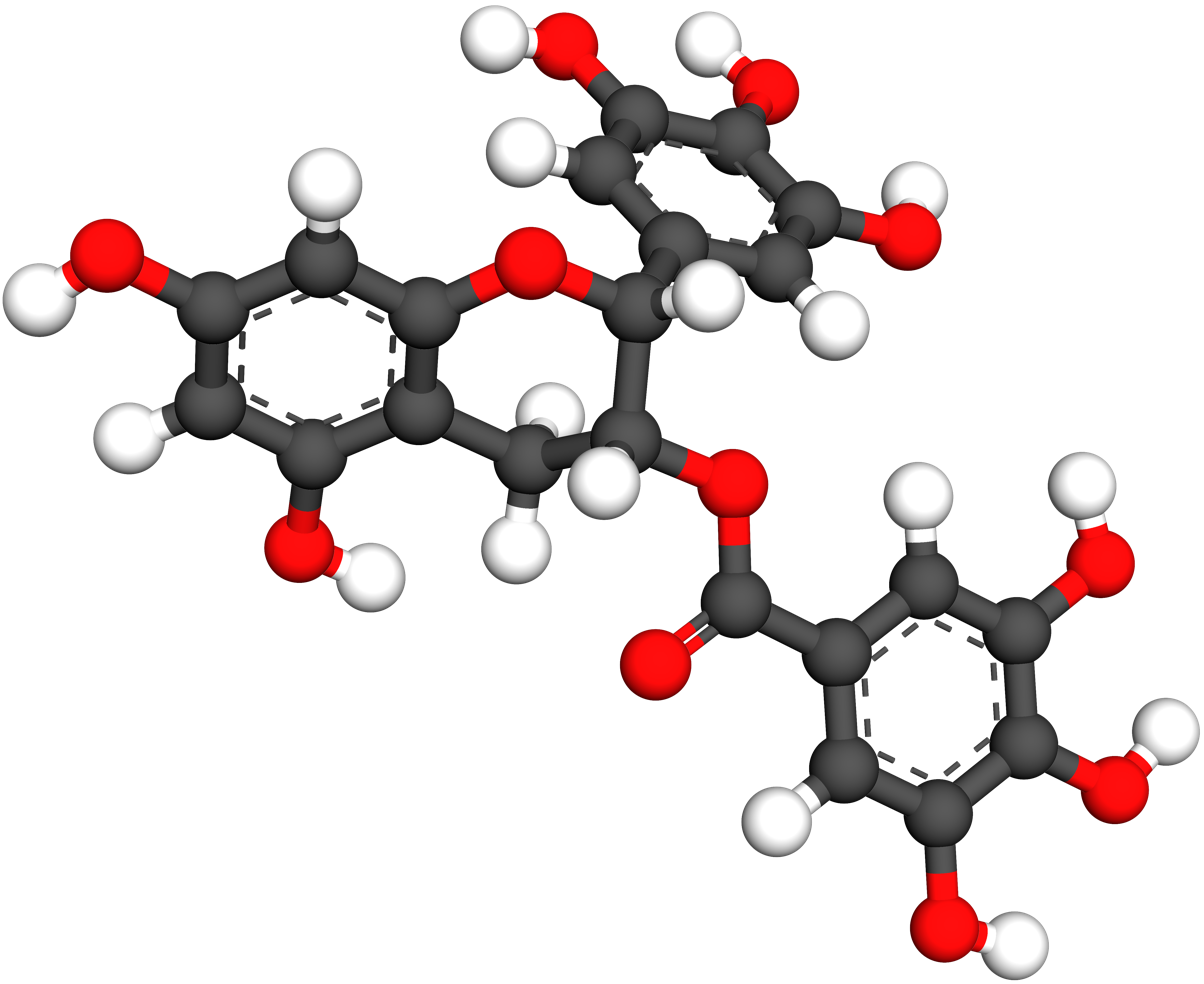

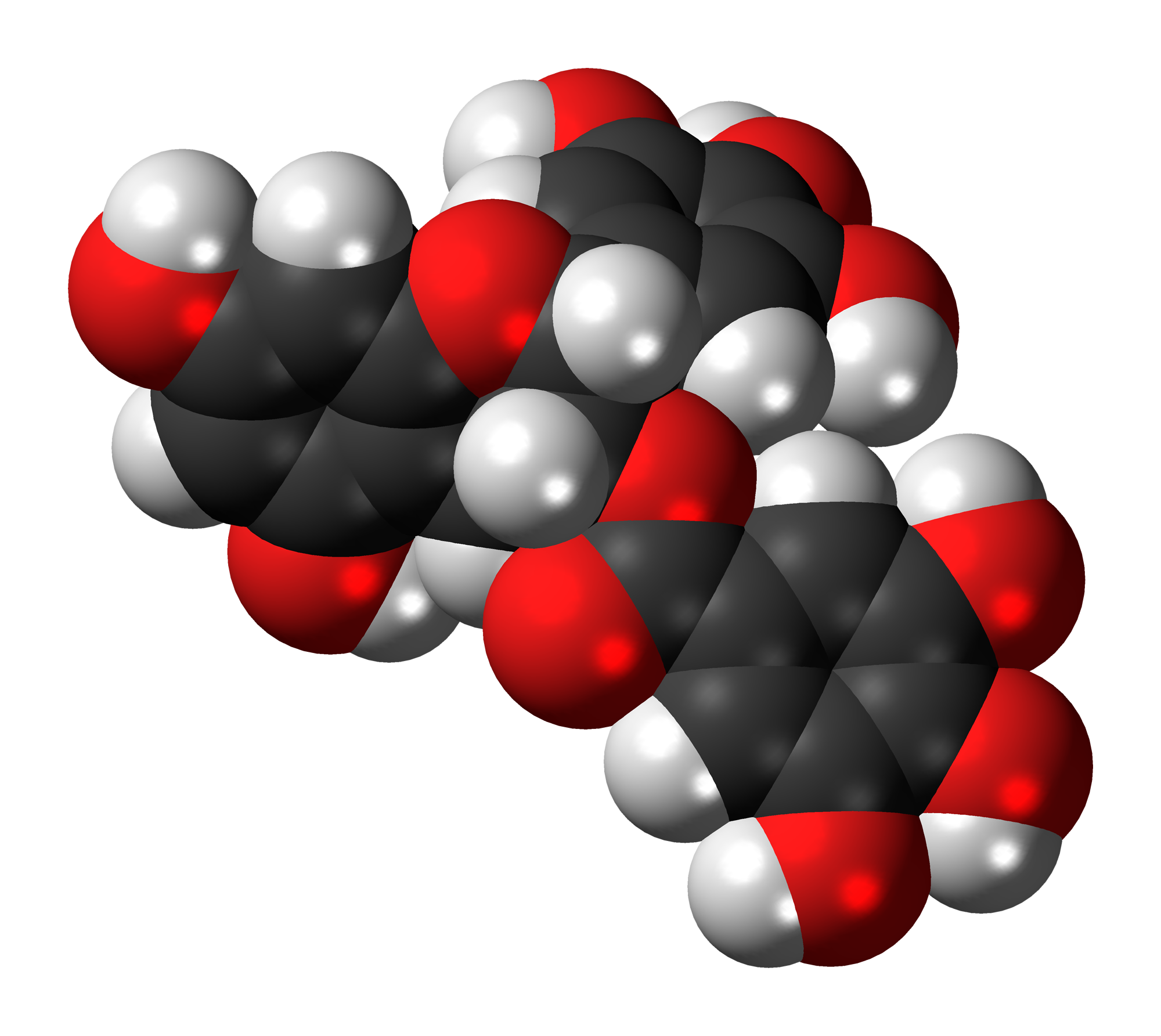

Names
- IUPAC name (2R,3R)-3′,4′,5,5′,7-Pentahydroxyflavan-3-yl 3,4,5-trihydroxybenzoate
- Systematic IUPAC name (2R,3R)-5,7-Dihydroxy-2-(3,4,5-trihydroxyphenyl)-3,4-dihydro-2H-1-benzopyran-3-yl 3,4,5-trihydroxybenzoate
- Other names (-)-Epigallocatechin gallate (2R,3R)-3′,4′,5,5′,7-pentahydroxyflavan-3-yl gallate

Identifiers
CAS Number	989-51-5
3D model (JSmol)	Interactive image
ChEBI	CHEBI:4806
ChEMBL	ChEMBL297453
ChemSpider	58575
ECHA InfoCard	100.111.017
IUPHAR/BPS	7002
KEGG	C09731
MeSH	Epigallocatechin+gallate
PubChem CID	65064
UNII	BQM438CTEL
CompTox Dashboard (EPA)	DTXSID1029889
- InChI: InChI=1S/C22H18O11/c23-10-5-12(24)11-7-18(33-22(31)9-3-15(27)20(30)16(28)4-9)21(32-17(11)6-10)8-1-13(25)19(29)14(26)2-8/h1-6,18,21,23-30H,7H2/t18-,21-/m1/s1 Key: WMBWREPUVVBILR-WIYYLYMNSA-N; InChI=1/C22H18O11/c23-10-5-12(24)11-7-18(33-22(31)9-3-15(27)20(30)16(28)4-9)21(32-17(11)6-10)8-1-13(25)19(29)14(26)2-8/h1-6,18,21,23-30H,7H2/t18-,21-/m1/s1 Key: WMBWREPUVVBILR-WIYYLYMNBM
- SMILES: O=C(O[C@@H]2Cc3c(O[C@@H]2c1cc(O)c(O)c(O)c1)cc(O)cc3O)c4cc(O)c(O)c(O)c4

Properties
Chemical formula	C_{22}H_{18}O_{11}
Molar mass	458.372 g/mol
Solubility in water	soluble (5 g/L)
Solubility	soluble in ethanol, DMSO, dimethyl formamide at about 20 g/L
- Except where otherwise noted, data are given for materials in their standard state (at 25 °C [77 °F], 100 kPa). verify (what is ?) Infobox references

Epigallocatechin gallate (EGCG), also known as epigallocatechin-3-gallate, is the ester of epigallocatechin and gallic acid, and is a type of catechin.

EGCG—the most abundant catechin in tea—is a polyphenol under basic research for its potential to affect human health and disease. EGCG is used in numerous dietary supplements.

== Food sources ==
=== Tea ===
It is found in high content in the dried leaves of green tea (7380 mg per 100 g), white tea (4245 mg per 100 g), and in smaller quantities, black tea (936 mg per 100 g). During black tea production, the catechins are mostly converted to theaflavins and thearubigins via polyphenol oxidases.

=== Other ===
Trace amounts are found in apple skin, plums, onions, hazelnuts, pecans, and carob powder (at 109 mg per 100 g).

== Bioavailability ==
When taken orally, EGCG has poor absorption even at daily intake equivalent to 8 to 16 cups of green tea, an amount causing adverse effects such as nausea or heartburn. After consumption, EGCG blood levels peak within 1.7 hours. The absorbed plasma half-life is around 5 hours, but with majority of unchanged EGCG excreted into urine over 0 to 8 hours. Methylated metabolites appear to have longer half-lives and occur at 8 to 25 times the plasma levels of unmetabolized EGCG.

== Research ==
Well-studied in basic research, EGCG has various biological effects in laboratory studies.

A 2011 analysis by the European Food Safety Authority found that a cause and effect relationship could not be shown for a link between tea catechins and the maintenance of normal blood LDL-cholesterol concentration. A 2016 review found that high daily doses (107 to 856 mg/day) taken by human subjects over four to 14 weeks produced a small reduction of LDL cholesterol.

Some studies have found that EGCG may help mitigate bladder dysfunction in ketamine-induced cystitis by normalizing the collagen-to-muscle ratio and restoring storage capacity.

== Potential toxicity ==
A 2018 review showed that excessive intake of EGCG may cause liver toxicity. In 2018, the European Food Safety Authority stated that daily intake of 800 mg or more could increase risk of liver damage.

Taken as a capsule or tablet 338 mg per day of EGCG is considered safe, whereas 704 mg per day is safe if consumed as a tea beverage. 100 mL of green tea contains about 70.2 mg of EGCG (about 165 mg per cup).

== Regulation ==
Over 2008 to 2017, the US Food and Drug Administration issued several warning letters to manufacturers of dietary supplements containing EGCG for violations of the Federal Food, Drug, and Cosmetic Act. Most of these letters informed the companies that their promotional materials promoted EGCG-based dietary supplements in the treatment or prevention of diseases or conditions that cause them to be classified as drugs under the United States code, while another focused on inadequate quality assurance procedures and labeling violations. The warnings were issued because the products had not been established as safe and effective for their marketed uses and were promoted as "new drugs", without approval as required under the Act.

== See also ==
- Health effects of tea
- Tannin
- Phenolic content in tea
- List of phytochemicals in food
