= Theaflavin =

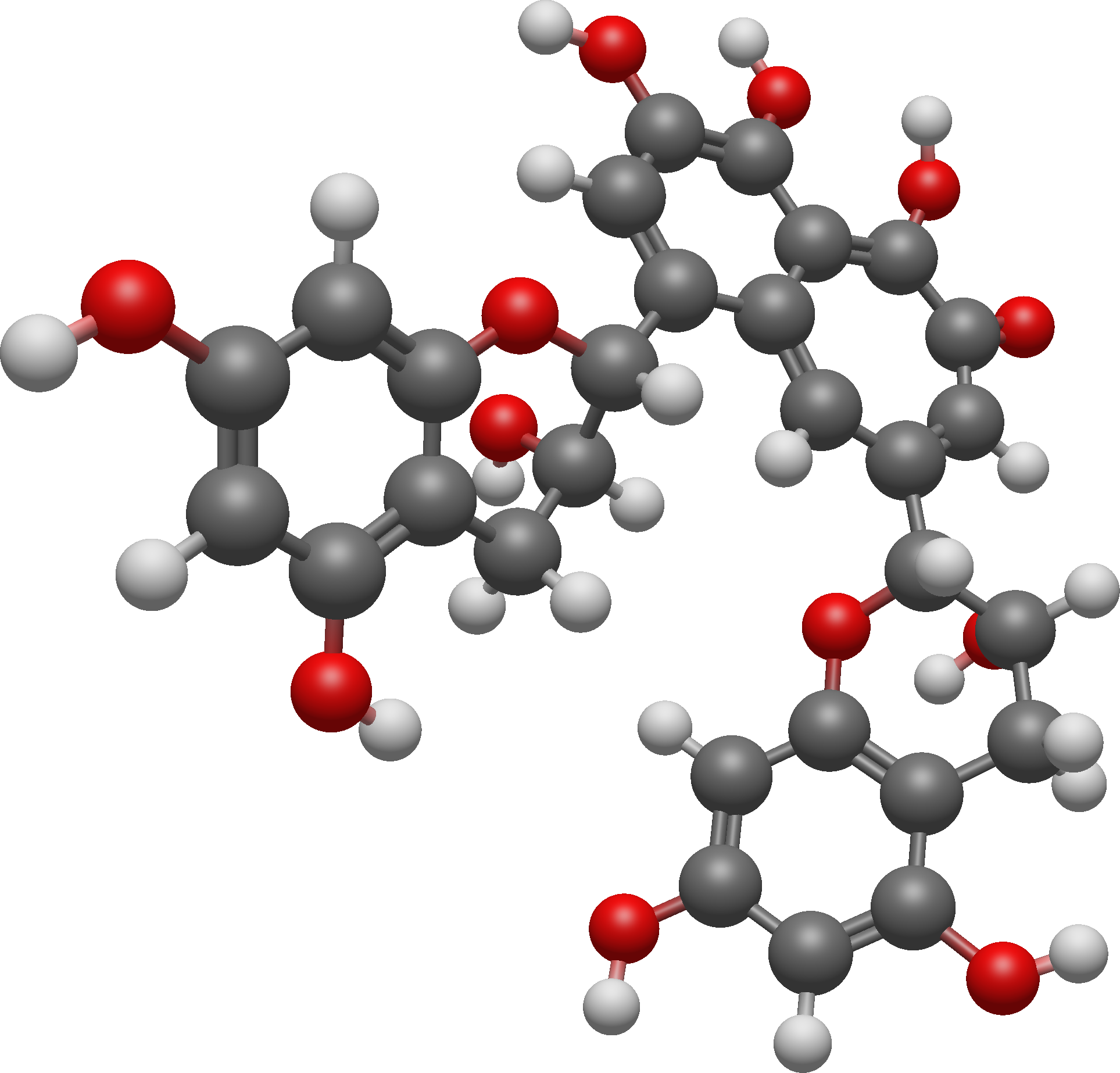

Names
- Systematic IUPAC name 3,4,5-Trihydroxy-1,8-bis[(2R,3R)-3,5,7-trihydroxy-3,4-dihydro-2H-1-benzopyran-2-yl]-6H-benzo[7]annulen-6-one

Identifiers
CAS Number	4670-05-7
3D model (JSmol)	Interactive image
ChEMBL	ChEMBL346119
ChemSpider	102754
PubChem CID	114777
UNII	1IA46M0D13
CompTox Dashboard (EPA)	DTXSID40196916
- InChI: InChI=1S/C29H24O12/c30-11-3-17(32)15-8-21(36)28(40-23(15)5-11)10-1-13-14(7-20(35)27(39)25(13)26(38)19(34)2-10)29-22(37)9-16-18(33)4-12(31)6-24(16)41-29/h1-7,21-22,28-33,35-37,39H,8-9H2,(H,34,38)/t21-,22-,28-,29-/m1/s1 Key: IPMYMEWFZKHGAX-ZKSIBHASSA-N; InChI=1/C29H24O12/c30-11-3-17(32)15-8-21(36)28(40-23(15)5-11)10-1-13-14(7-20(35)27(39)25(13)26(38)19(34)2-10)29-22(37)9-16-18(33)4-12(31)6-24(16)41-29/h1-7,21-22,28-33,35-37,39H,8-9H2,(H,34,38)/t21-,22-,28-,29-/m1/s1 Key: IPMYMEWFZKHGAX-ZKSIBHASBU
- SMILES: c1c(cc(=O)c(c2c1c(cc(c2O)O)[C@@H]3[C@@H](Cc4c(cc(cc4O3)O)O)O)O)[C@@H]5[C@@H](Cc6c(cc(cc6O5)O)O)O

Properties
Chemical formula	C_{29}H_{24}O_{12}
Molar mass	564.499 g·mol^{−1}
- Except where otherwise noted, data are given for materials in their standard state (at 25 °C [77 °F], 100 kPa). verify (what is ?) Infobox references

Theaflavin and its derivatives, known collectively as theaflavins, are polyphenols that are formed from the condensation of flavan-3-ols in tea leaves during the enzymatic oxidation (sometimes erroneously referred to as fermentation) of black tea. Theaflavin-3-gallate, theaflavin-3'-gallate, and theaflavin-3-3'-digallate are the main theaflavins. Theaflavins are types of thearubigins, and are therefore reddish in color.

== See also ==
- Theaflavin 3-gallate
