= C15H14O5 =

The molecular formula C_{15}H_{14}O_{5} (molar mass : 274.26 g/mol, exact mass : 274.084123) may refer to:

Polyphenols

- Afzelechin (epiafzelechin), a flavan-3-ol
- Apiforol, a flavan-4-ol
- Fisetinidol, a flavan-3-ol
- Gnetucleistol B, a stilbenoid
- Luteoliflavan, a neoflavanoid
- Methysticin, a kavalactone
- Oritin (epioritin), a flavan-3-ol
- Phloretin, a dihydrochalcone
