= Promelacacinidin =

Promelacacinidin is a polymeric condensed tannin composed of mesquitol. This type of tannin can be found in Senegalia afra.

The oxidative depolymerization of proteracacinidins yields the anthocyanidin melacacinidin.
