= Oritin =

Names
- IUPAC name (2S,3R)-2-(4-Hydroxyphenyl)-3,4-dihydro-2H-chromene-3,7,8-triol

Identifiers
3D model (JSmol)	Interactive image
PubChem CID	101553669
- InChI: InChI=1S/C15H14O5/c16-10-4-1-8(2-5-10)14-12(18)7-9-3-6-11(17)13(19)15(9)20-14/h1-6,12,14,16-19H,7H2/t12-,14+/m1/s1 Key: CWRQBLAVCJKBEK-OCCSQVGLSA-N
- SMILES: C1[C@H]([C@@H](OC2=C1C=CC(=C2O)O)C3=CC=C(C=C3)O)O

Properties
Chemical formula	C_{14}H_{14}O_{5}
Molar mass	262.261 g·mol^{−1}
- Except where otherwise noted, data are given for materials in their standard state (at 25 °C [77 °F], 100 kPa). Infobox references

Oritin is a flavan-3-ol, a type of flavonoid. It is a component of the proteracacinidin tannins of Acacia galpinii and Senegalia afra (Acacia afra).
