= White flower colouration =

White flower colour is related to the absence or reduction of the anthocyanidin content. Unlike other colors, white colour is not induced by pigments. Several white plant tissues are principally equipped with the complete machinery for anthocyanin biosynthesis including the expression of regulatory genes. Nevertheless, they are unable to accumulate red or blue pigments, for example Dahlia ´Seattle´ petals showing a white tip. Several studies have revealed a further reduction of the anthocyanidins to colorless epicatechin by the enzyme anthocyanidin reductase (ANR).

== Cultivation and modification of colour ==
Many external factors can influence colour: light, temperature, pH, sugars and metals. There is a method to turn petunia flowers from white to transparent. The petunia flower is immersed into a flask of water, connected to a vacuum pump, after which the flower appears colourless. The white colour is expressed by the air present in the vacuoles that absorbs the light, without air the flower loses the white colour.

There is an increasing interest in flower colour, since some colorations are currently unavailable in plants. Ornamental companies create new flower colours by classical and mutation breeding and biotechnological approaches. For example, white bracts in Poinsettia are obtained by high frequency irradiation.

== See also ==
- Basics of blue flower colouration
