= Phyllonorycter leucaspis =

Scientific classification
- Kingdom: Animalia
- Phylum: Arthropoda
- Clade: Pancrustacea
- Class: Insecta
- Order: Lepidoptera
- Family: Gracillariidae
- Genus: Phyllonorycter
- Species: P. leucaspis

Binomial name
- Phyllonorycter leucaspis Triberti, 2004

Species of moth

Phyllonorycter leucaspis is a moth of the family Gracillariidae. It is known from Namibia. The habitat consists of richly vegetated valleys between 1,600 and 1,900 meters elevation dominated by Acacia hereroensis, Dombeya rotundifolia and Rhus species.

The length of the forewings is 3.53 mm. Adults are on wing in March.
