= Flavenol =

Flavenol is a misspelling of either of one of two different groups of chemicals that occur naturally in some plants:

- Flavonols
- Flavanols
