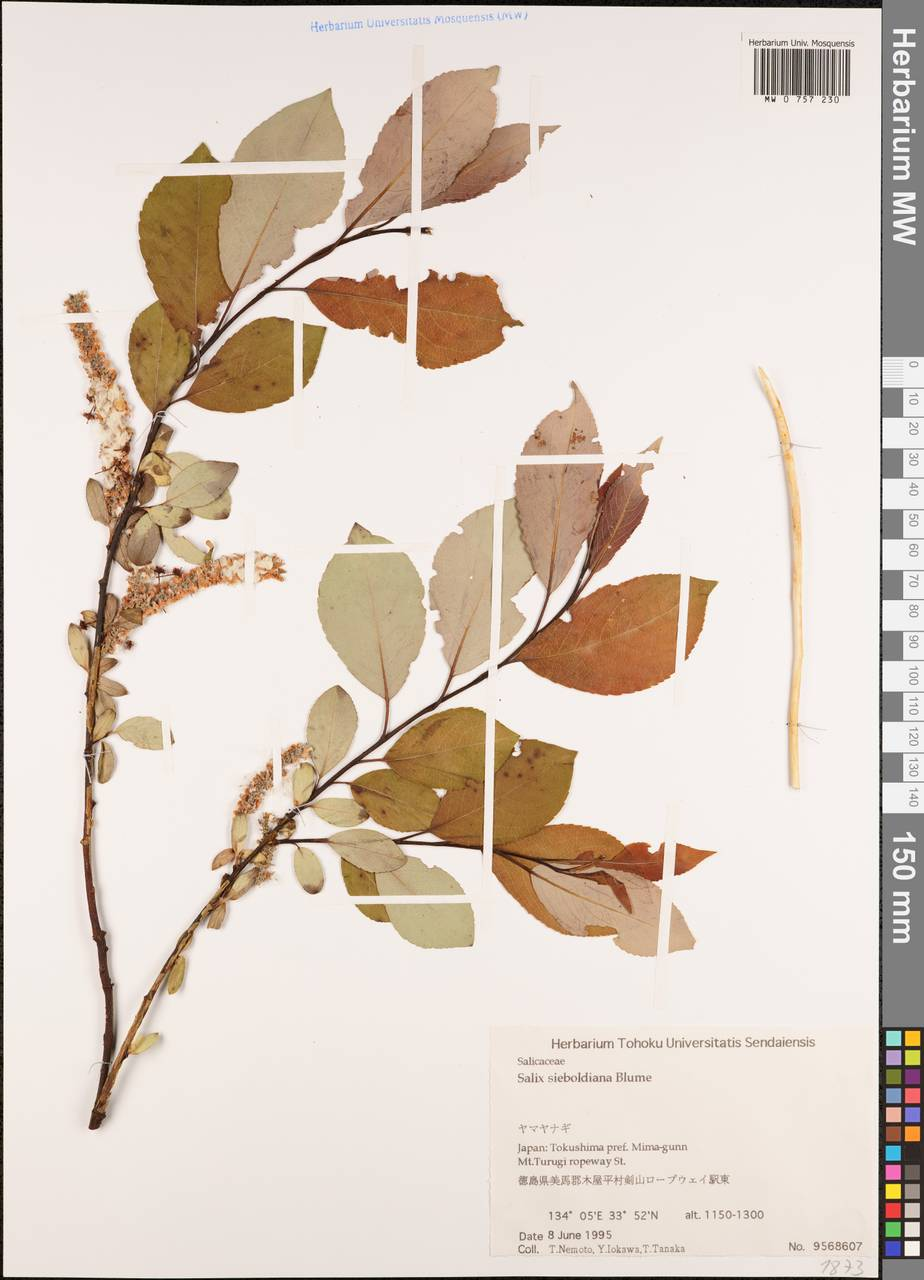

Conservation status
- Least Concern (IUCN 3.1)

Scientific classification
- Kingdom: Plantae
- Clade: Tracheophytes
- Clade: Angiosperms
- Clade: Eudicots
- Clade: Rosids
- Order: Malpighiales
- Family: Salicaceae
- Genus: Salix
- Species: S. sieboldiana

Binomial name
- Salix sieboldiana Blume

= Salix sieboldiana =

Species of willow

Salix sieboldiana is a species of willow native to southern Japan. It is a deciduous shrub or small tree.

The Latin specific epithet sieboldiana refers to German physician and botanist Philipp Franz von Siebold (1796-1866).

The bark of the tree contains flavanols and procyanidins.
