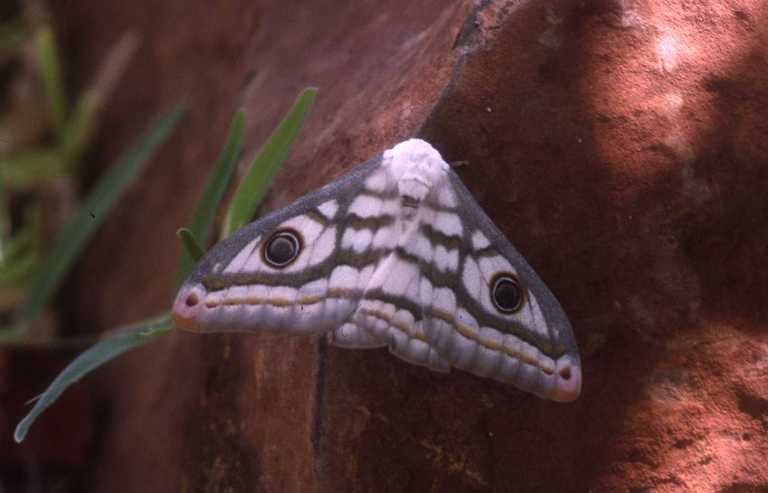
- Heniocha dyops

Scientific classification
- Domain: Eukaryota
- Kingdom: Animalia
- Phylum: Arthropoda
- Class: Insecta
- Order: Lepidoptera
- Family: Saturniidae
- Tribe: Bunaeini
- Genus: Heniocha; Hübner, [1819]

= Heniocha =

Genus of moths

Heniocha is a genus of moths in the family Saturniidae first described by Jacob Hübner in 1819.

== Species ==
- Heniocha apollonia (Cramer, 1782)
- Heniocha digennaroi Bouyer, 2008
- Heniocha distincta Bryk, 1939
- Heniocha dyops (Maassen, 1872)
- Heniocha hassoni Bouyer, 2008
- Heniocha marnois (Rogenhofer, 1891)
- Heniocha pudorosa Darge, 2005
- Heniocha vingerhoedti Bouyer, 1992
- Heniocha werneri Bouyer, 2001
