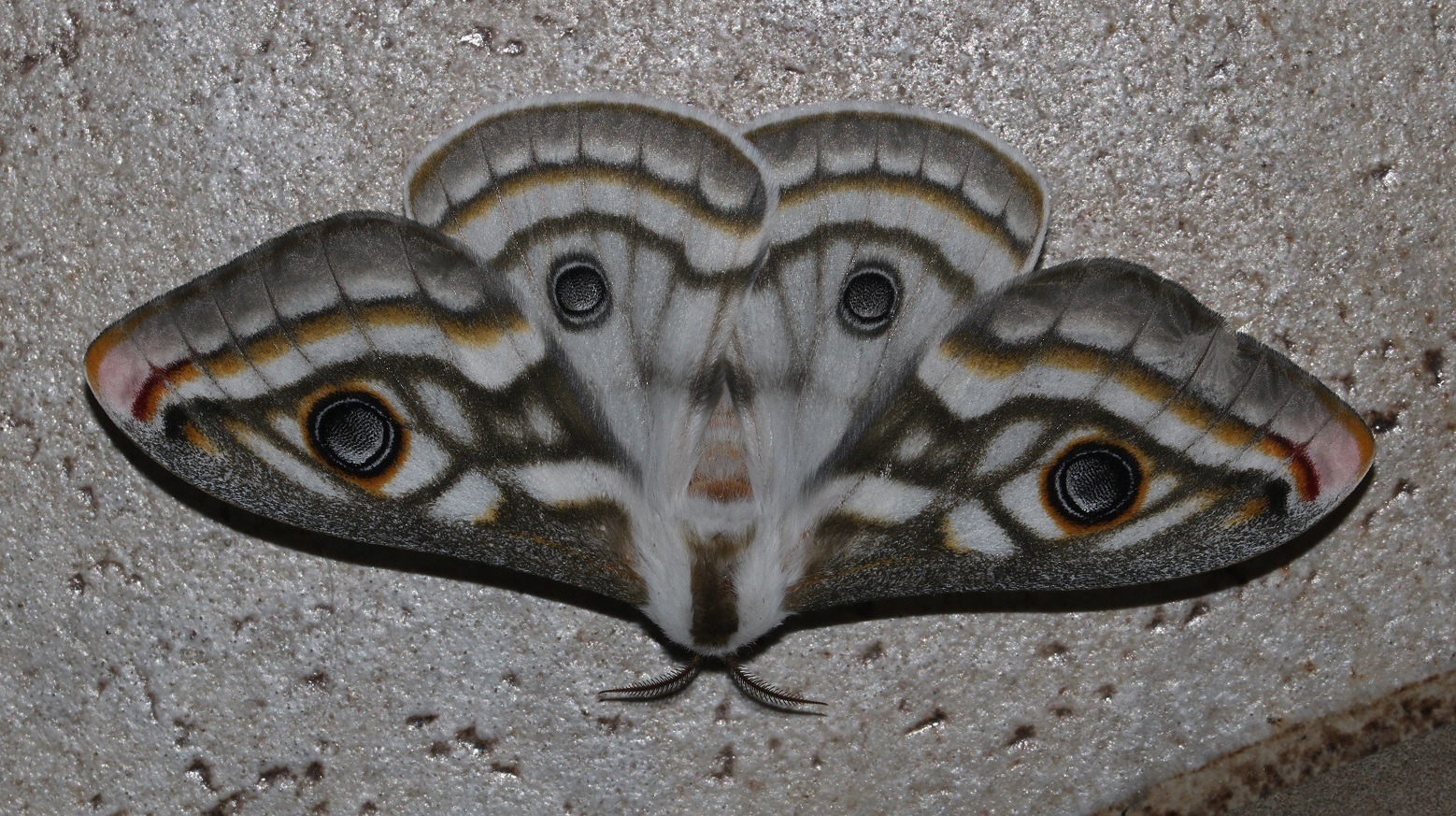

Scientific classification
- Kingdom: Animalia
- Phylum: Arthropoda
- Class: Insecta
- Order: Lepidoptera
- Family: Saturniidae
- Genus: Heniocha
- Species: H. apollonia

Binomial name
- Heniocha apollonia (Cramer, 1782)

Synonyms
- Bombyx apollonia; Heniocha apollina Gaede, 1927; Heniocha divisa Bryk, 1939; Heniocha flavida Butler, 1877; Heniocha lindti Grünberg, 1910; Heniocha terpsichorina Westwood, 1881

= Heniocha apollonia =

Species of moth

Heniocha apollonia, commonly known as the southern marbled emperor, is a nocturnal species of moth in the family Saturniidae. It is found in Botswana, Mozambique, Namibia, South Africa, Zambia, and Zimbabwe.

== Taxonomy ==
Heniocha apollonia contains the following subspecies:

- Heniocha apollonia apollonia
- Heniocha apollonia flavida
- Heniocha apollonia terpsichorina

== Recorded food plants ==
Heniocha apollonia larvae have been recorded feeding on Acatia mollissima, Acacia karroo, Acacia mearnsii.
