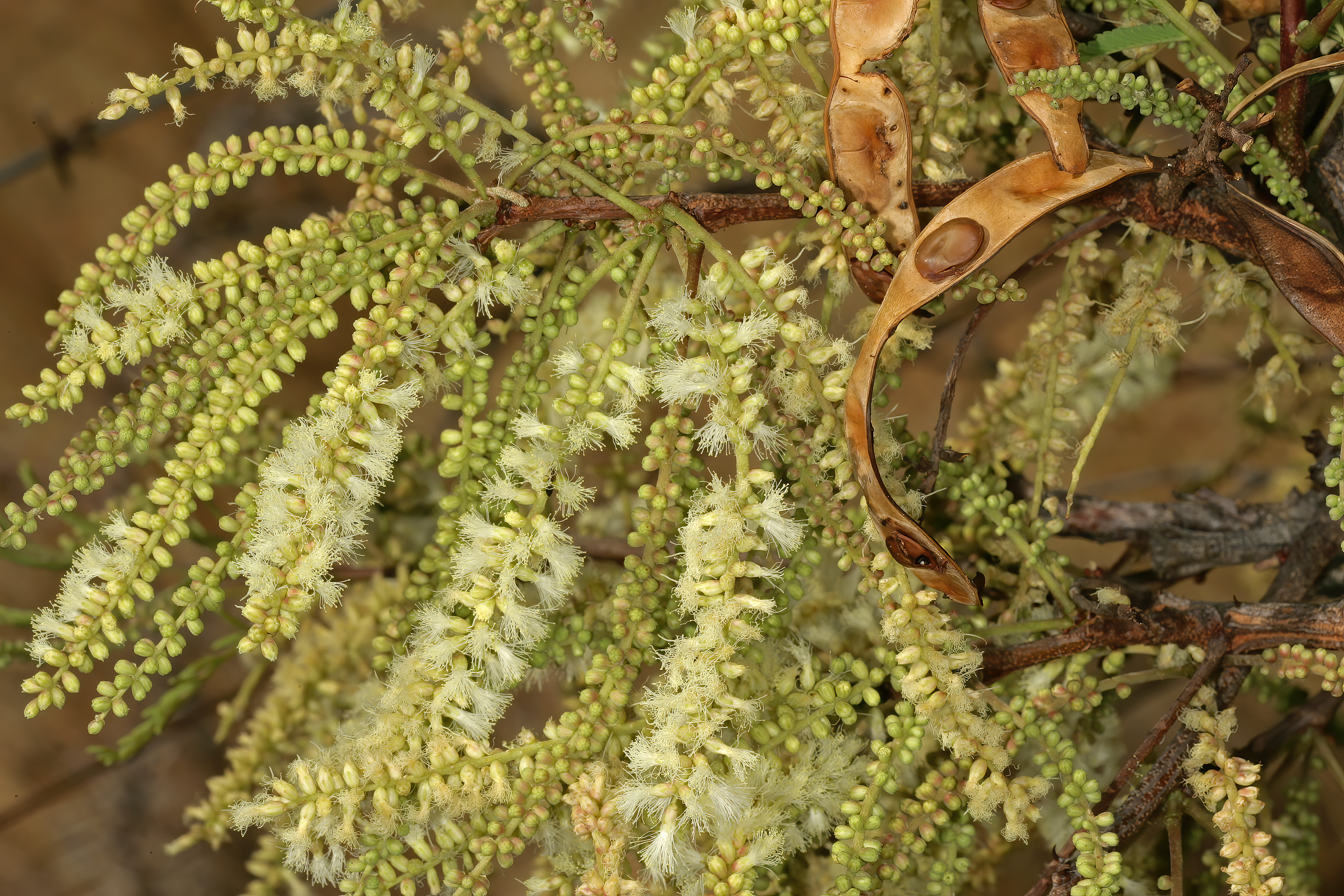

Conservation status
- Least Concern (IUCN 3.1)

Scientific classification
- Kingdom: Plantae
- Clade: Tracheophytes
- Clade: Angiosperms
- Clade: Eudicots
- Clade: Rosids
- Order: Fabales
- Family: Fabaceae
- Subfamily: Caesalpinioideae
- Clade: Mimosoid clade
- Genus: Senegalia
- Species: S. hereroensis

Binomial name
- Senegalia hereroensis (Engl.) Kyal. & Boatwr.

Synonyms
- Acacia hereroensis Engl. (1889); Acacia gansbergensis Schinz (1893); Acacia mellei I.Verd. (1942)

= Senegalia hereroensis =

Species of legume

Senegalia hereroensis is a species of trees in the genus Senegalia. It is indigenous to Southern Africa, and its native range includes western Zimbabwe, Botswana, and Namibia, and the Northern Provinces, Cape Provinces, and Free State of South Africa. It is native to Zambezian wooded grassland (savanna), and wooded grasslands of the Kalahari-Highveld regional transition zone.

Senegalia hereroensis may be confused with Senegalia afra but it has more robust prickles.

The larvae of the moths Phyllonorycter leucaspis and Heniocha dyops (marbled emperor) feed on S. hereroensis.
