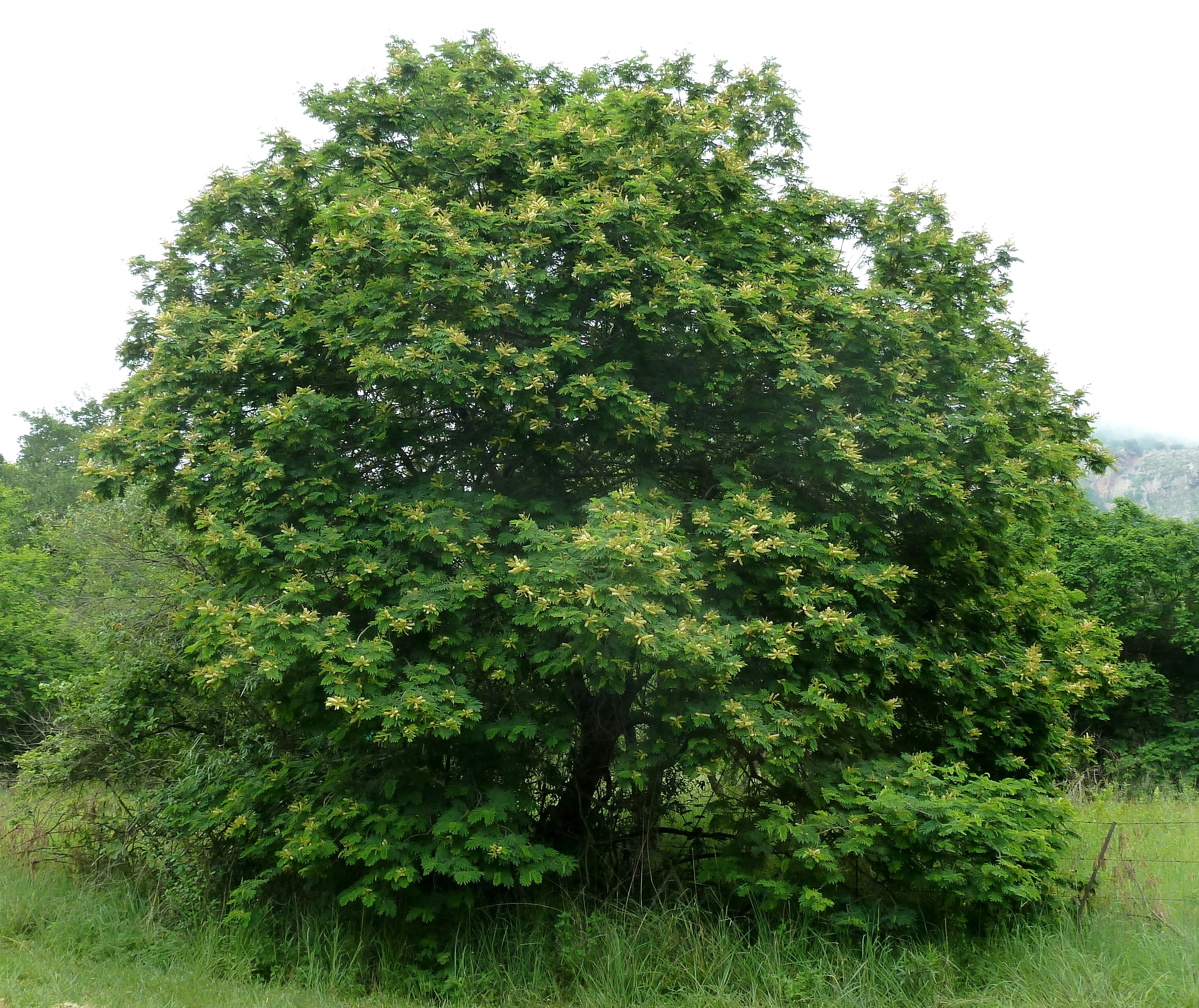
- Summer
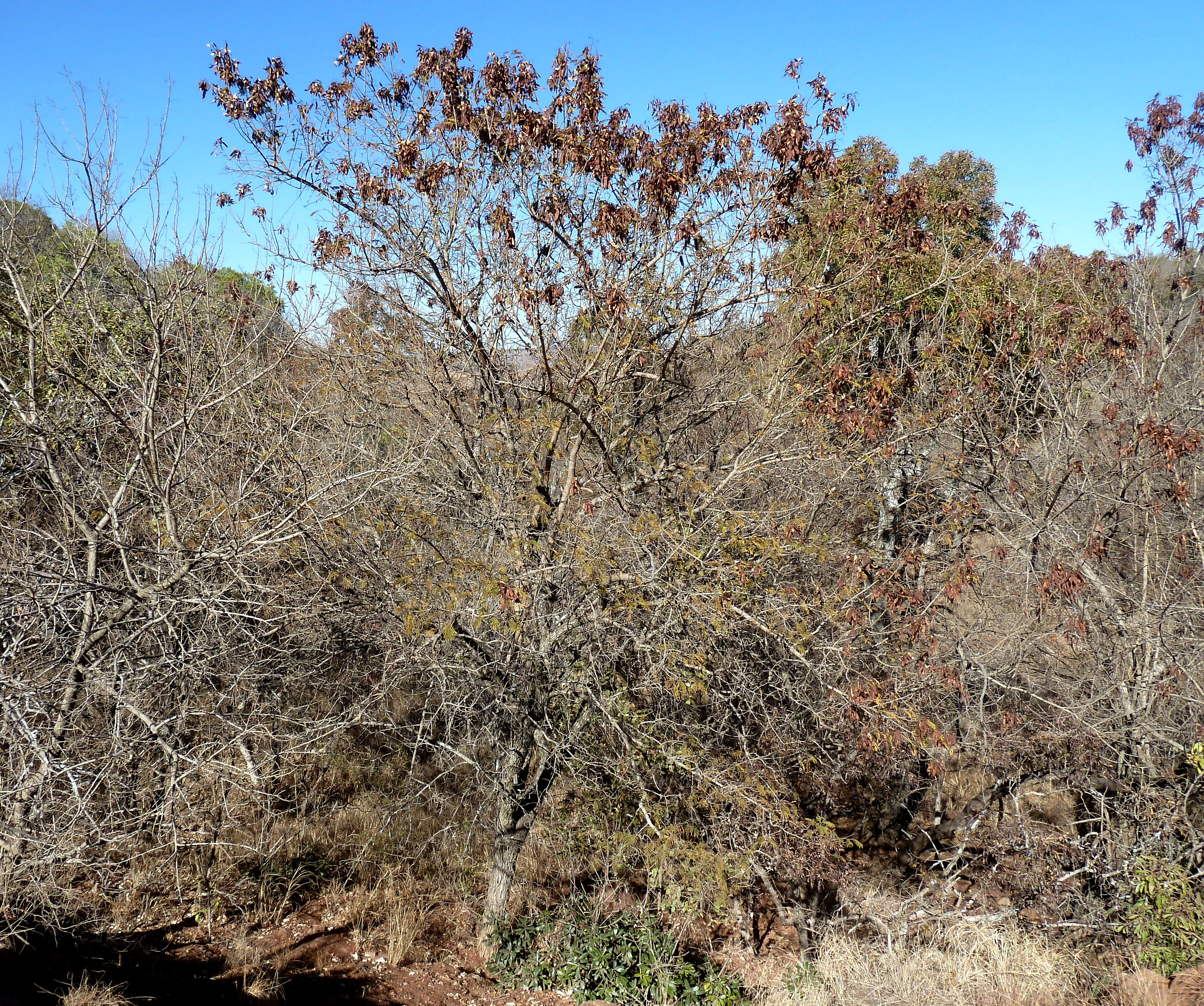
- Winter

Conservation status
- Least Concern (IUCN 3.1)

Scientific classification
- Kingdom: Plantae
- Clade: Tracheophytes
- Clade: Angiosperms
- Clade: Eudicots
- Clade: Rosids
- Order: Fabales
- Family: Fabaceae
- Subfamily: Caesalpinioideae
- Clade: Mimosoid clade
- Genus: Senegalia
- Species: S. ataxacantha

Binomial name
- Senegalia ataxacantha (DC.) Kyal. & Boatwr.

Synonyms
- Acacia ataxacantha DC.; Acacia eriadenia Benth. in Hook., Lond. Journ. Bot. 5: 98 (1846); Acacia lugardiae N.E.Br.

= Senegalia ataxacantha =

Species of legume

Senegalia ataxacantha, commonly known as the flame thorn, is an African tree species with conspicuous red pods and numerous hooked prickles.

== Range ==
It is widespread in sub-Saharan Africa from Senegal in the west to Sudan in the east, Namibia, Botswana, Zimbabwe, and in the Transvaal and KwaZulu-Natal. In arid regions it prefers low-lying sites near streams, watercourses and in valleys, but in higher rainfall areas is a common constituent of the bush, often favouring forest margins. Once established, young trees are quite frost-hardy.

== Description ==
Its normal habit is that of a multi-stemmed, untidy, large shrub with a tendency for the shoots to scramble using their recurved prickles, and often develops into a single-stemmed tree of 5-10m in height and 300mm trunk diameter. The rounded crown of dense, dark green foliage is composed of very small pinnules. Translucent red pods provide a colourful display when backlit. The flaking bark is light grey, splitting longitudinally and transversely, and revealing a buff under-colour. The persistent prickles are profuse on young twigs, but can also be found on older wood. Unlike other species of the genus Acacia, the prickles are not in pairs, but scattered along young twigs ('ataxacantha' = orderless prickles).

Flowers occur as clusters of off-white or cream-coloured terminal spikes which are fragrant and bloom during spring and summer. The timber, resembling that of Acacia melanoxylon, often has heart rot, but when sound is of good quality and handsomely streaked in black, dark brown, purple and cream, with markedly contrasting off-white sapwood.

The appearance of this species may be confused with Senegalia afra which differs by having paired prickles, stouter pods and greyish-green markedly pendent foliage.

== Uses ==
Traditionally, the root bark is used as an aphrodisiac.

== See also ==
- List of Southern African indigenous trees and woody lianes

== Gallery ==
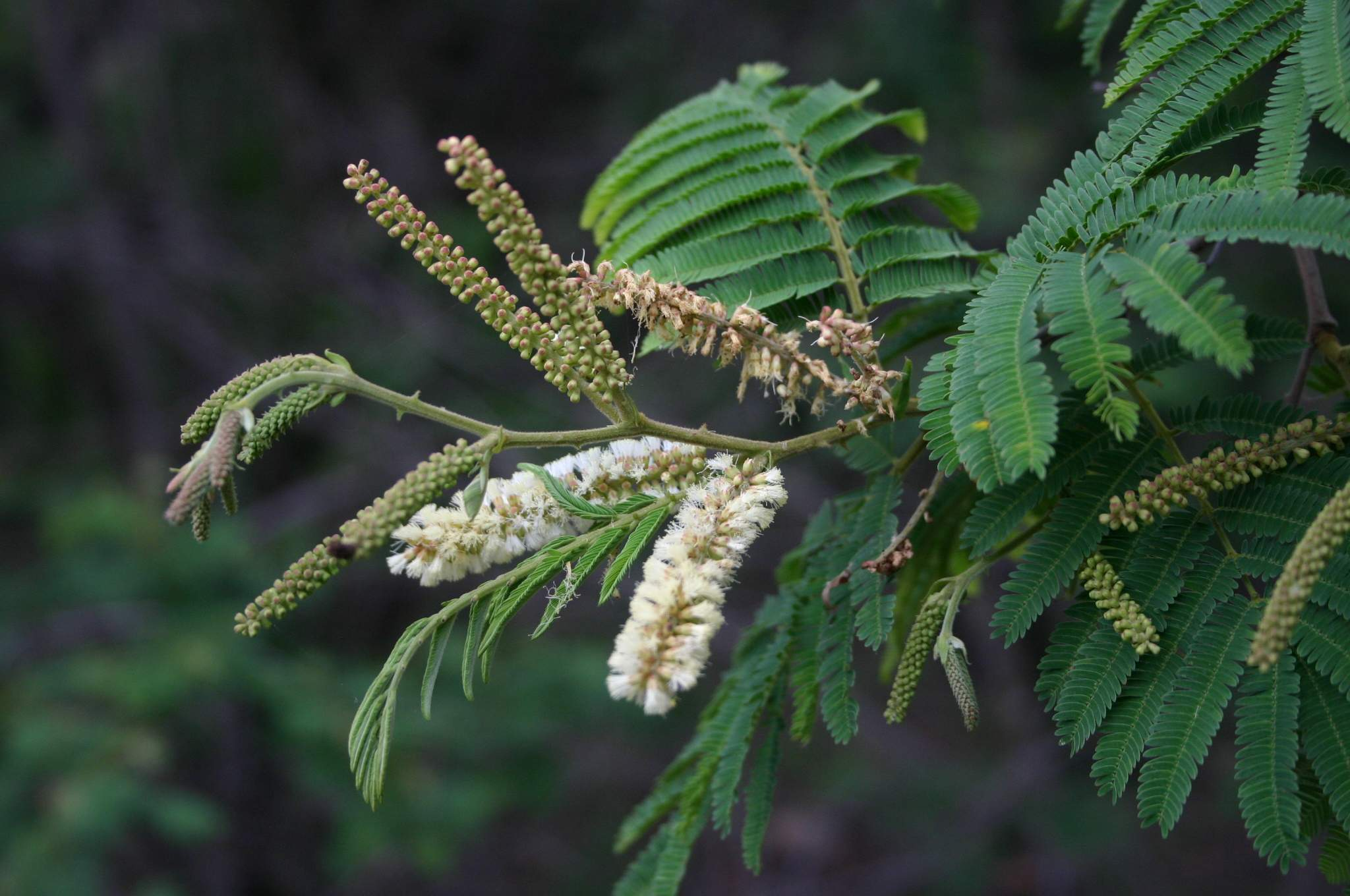
Flower and leaf buds

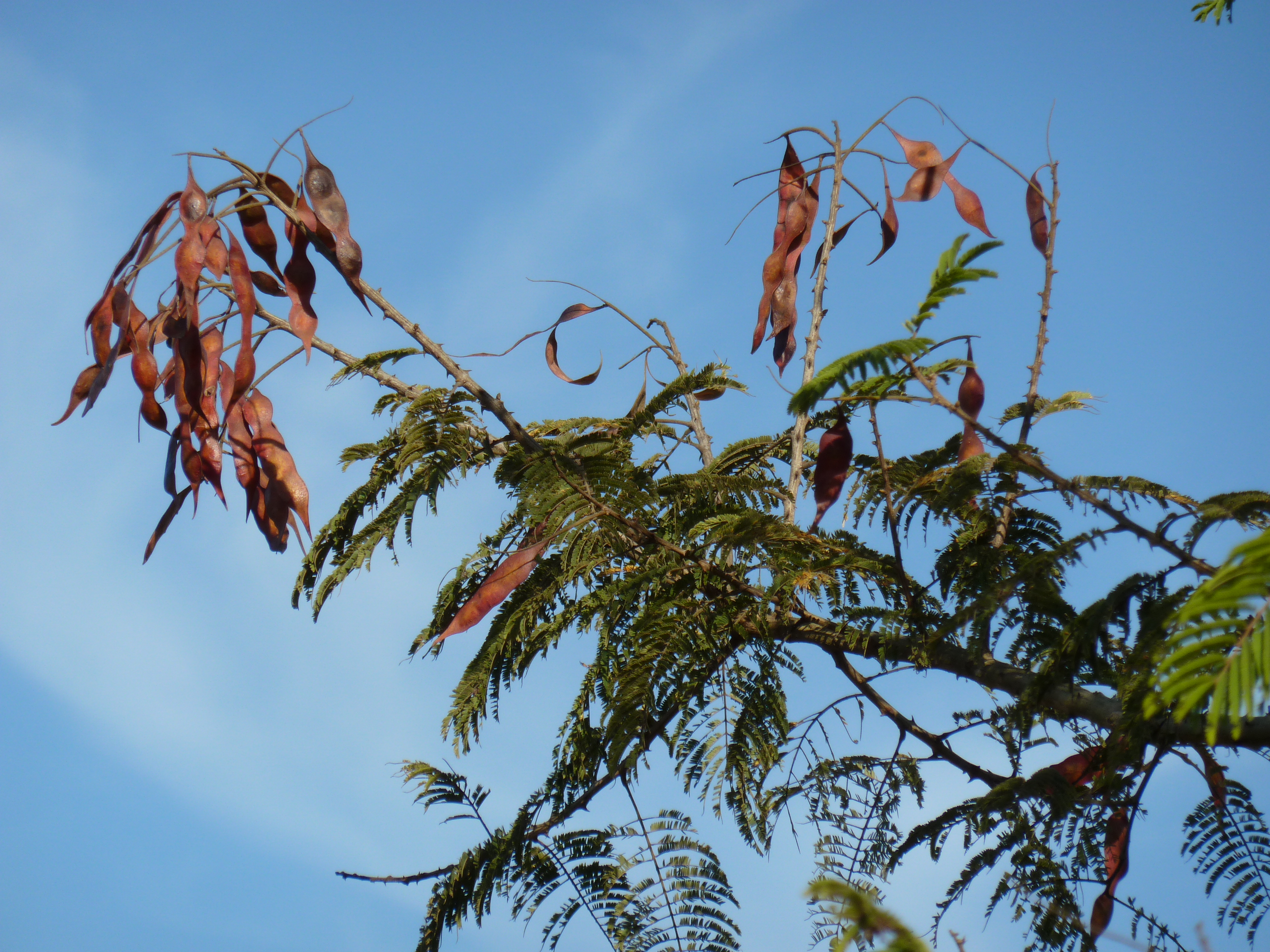
Foliage and pods

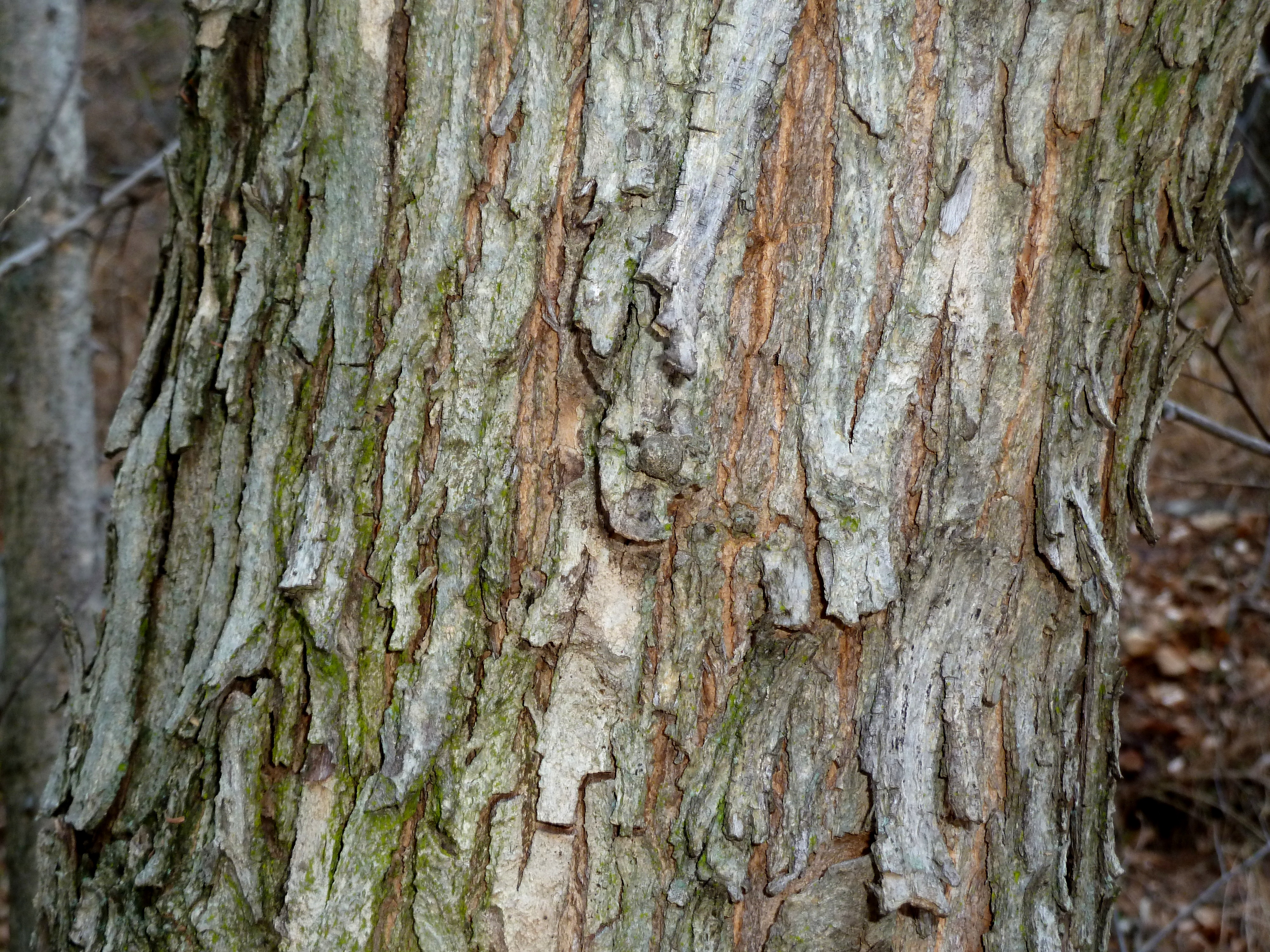
Bark texture

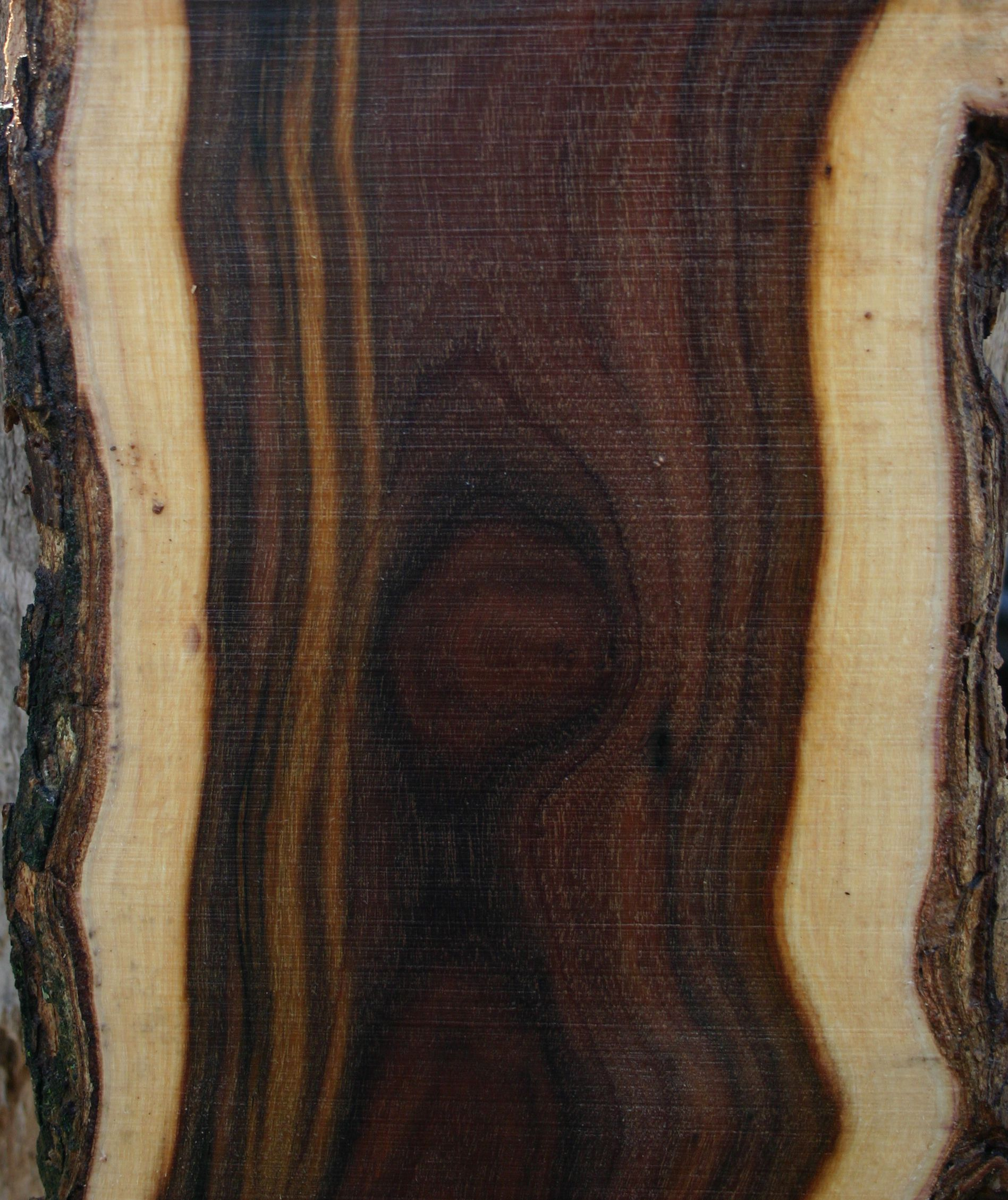
Heartwood/sapwood
