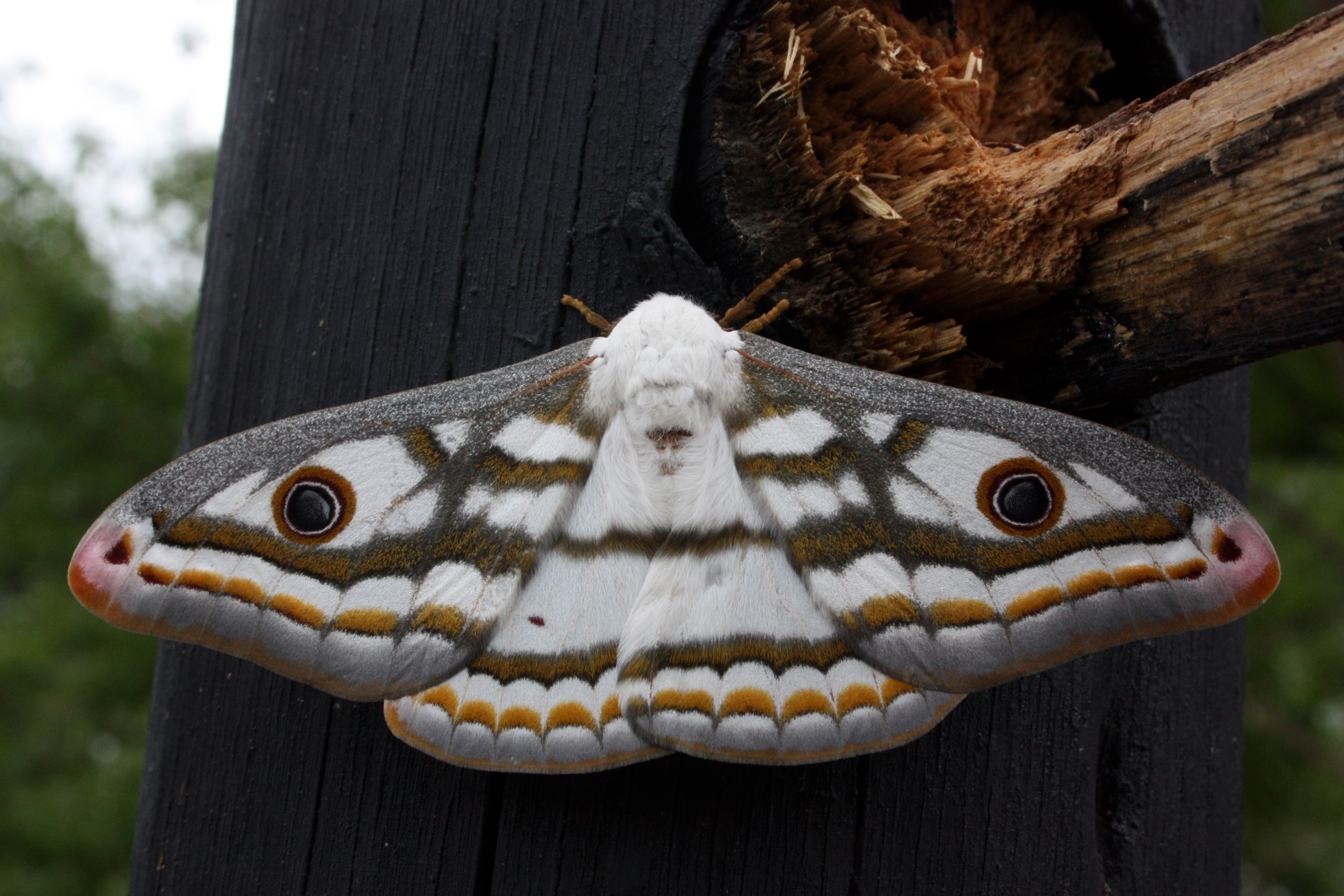

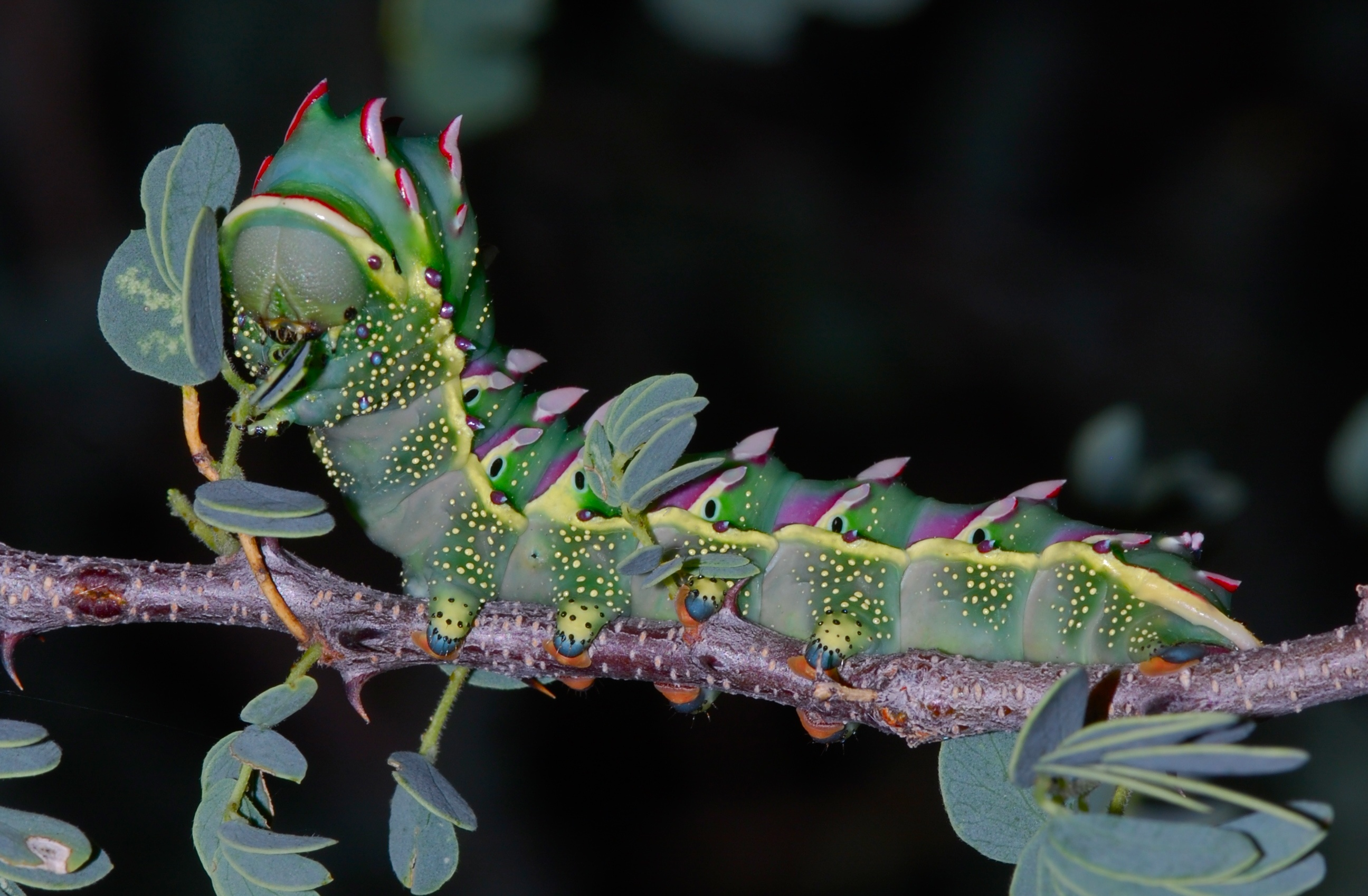

Scientific classification
- Kingdom: Animalia
- Phylum: Arthropoda
- Class: Insecta
- Order: Lepidoptera
- Family: Saturniidae
- Genus: Heniocha
- Species: H. dyops

Binomial name
- Heniocha dyops (Maassen, 1872)

Synonyms
- Saturnia dyops Maassen, 1872; Heniocha bioculata Aurivillius, 1879; Heniocha dryops Packard, 1914

= Heniocha dyops =

Marbled emperor

Species of moth

Heniocha dyops, the marbled emperor, is a moth of the family Saturniidae First described by J. Peter Maassen in 1872. It is found in Angola, Botswana, Congo, Mozambique, Zambia, Zimbabwe Kenya, Namibia, South Africa, and Tanzania.

The larvae feed on Acacia mearnsii, Acacia burkei, Acacia hereroensis, Acacia karroo, Acacia mellifera and Acacia nigrescens.
