= Luteoliflavan =

Names
- IUPAC name (2S)-2-(3,4-dihydroxyphenyl)-3,4-dihydro-2H-chromene-5,7-diol
- Other names 3',4',5,7-tetrahydroxyflavan

Identifiers
CAS Number	446-06-0
3D model (JSmol)	Interactive image
ChEBI	CHEBI:29620
ChemSpider	558684
KEGG	C12122
PubChem CID	643542
CompTox Dashboard (EPA)	DTXCID50300289
- InChI: InChI=1S/C15H14O5/c16-9-6-12(18)10-2-4-14(20-15(10)7-9)8-1-3-11(17)13(19)5-8/h1,3,5-7,14,16-19H,2,4H2/t14-/m0/s1 Key: GWCPBEMISACTHQ-AWEZNQCLSA-N
- SMILES: C1CC2=C(C=C(C=C2OC1C3=CC(=C(C=C3)O)O)O)O

Properties
Chemical formula	C_{15}H_{14}O_{5}
Molar mass	274.272 g·mol^{−1}
- Except where otherwise noted, data are given for materials in their standard state (at 25 °C [77 °F], 100 kPa). Infobox references

Luteoliflavan is a flavan, a type of neoflavonoid (a polyphenolic compound). Its chemical formula is C_{15}H_{14}O_{5}. The compound has been found in Malus domestica, Malus pumila, and Camellia sinensis. Luteoliflavan is a tetrahydroxyflavan, in which the four hydroxy groups are located at positions 3', 4', 5, and 7. The compound plays a role as a plant metabolite.

== Synthesis ==
Luteoliflavan can be prepared via both natural biosynthetic pathways in plants and synthetic organic chemistry methods.

== Uses ==
Luteoliflavan offers diverse biological activities that have led to its exploration in various medical applications: cancer therapy, diabetes management, neurological disorders.
