= Mesquitol =

- Chemical structure of mesquitol

Names
- IUPAC name (2R,3S)-Flavan-3,3′,4′,7,8-pentol
- Systematic IUPAC name (2R,3S)-2-(3,4-Dihydroxyphenyl)-3,4-dihydro-2H-1-benzopyran-3,7,8-triol
- Other names (−)-mesquitol

Identifiers
CAS Number	109671-55-8
3D model (JSmol)	Interactive image
ChemSpider	9208756
PubChem CID	11033582
UNII	584GQF2MLB
CompTox Dashboard (EPA)	DTXSID10551896
- InChI: InChI=1S/C15H14O6/c16-9-3-1-7(5-11(9)18)14-12(19)6-8-2-4-10(17)13(20)15(8)21-14/h1-5,12,14,16-20H,6H2/t12-,14+/m0/s1 Key: TXULLYMENMRLHL-GXTWGEPZSA-N; InChI=1/C15H14O6/c16-9-3-1-7(5-11(9)18)14-12(19)6-8-2-4-10(17)13(20)15(8)21-14/h1-5,12,14,16-20H,6H2/t12-,14+/m0/s1 Key: TXULLYMENMRLHL-GXTWGEPZBX
- SMILES: Oc1ccc(cc1O)[C@H]3Oc2c(O)c(O)ccc2C[C@@H]3O

Properties
Chemical formula	C_{15}H_{14}O_{6}
Molar mass	290.26 g/mol
- Except where otherwise noted, data are given for materials in their standard state (at 25 °C [77 °F], 100 kPa). verify (what is ?) Infobox references

Mesquitol is a flavan-3-ol, a type of flavonoid.

Prosopis juliflora, an invasive New World mesquite now found in Kenya, has unusually high levels of (−)-mesquitol in its heartwood.

Mesquitol, with its pyrogallol-type A-ring, is more susceptible to quinone formation at this ring, leading to aryl–aryl bond formation at carbon 5. The structural moieties constitute the proteracacinidin class of proanthocyanidins. Mesquitol-(5→8)-catechin atropisomers can be isolated from Prosopis glandulosa.
