= Fisetinidol =

- Chemical structure of fisetinidol

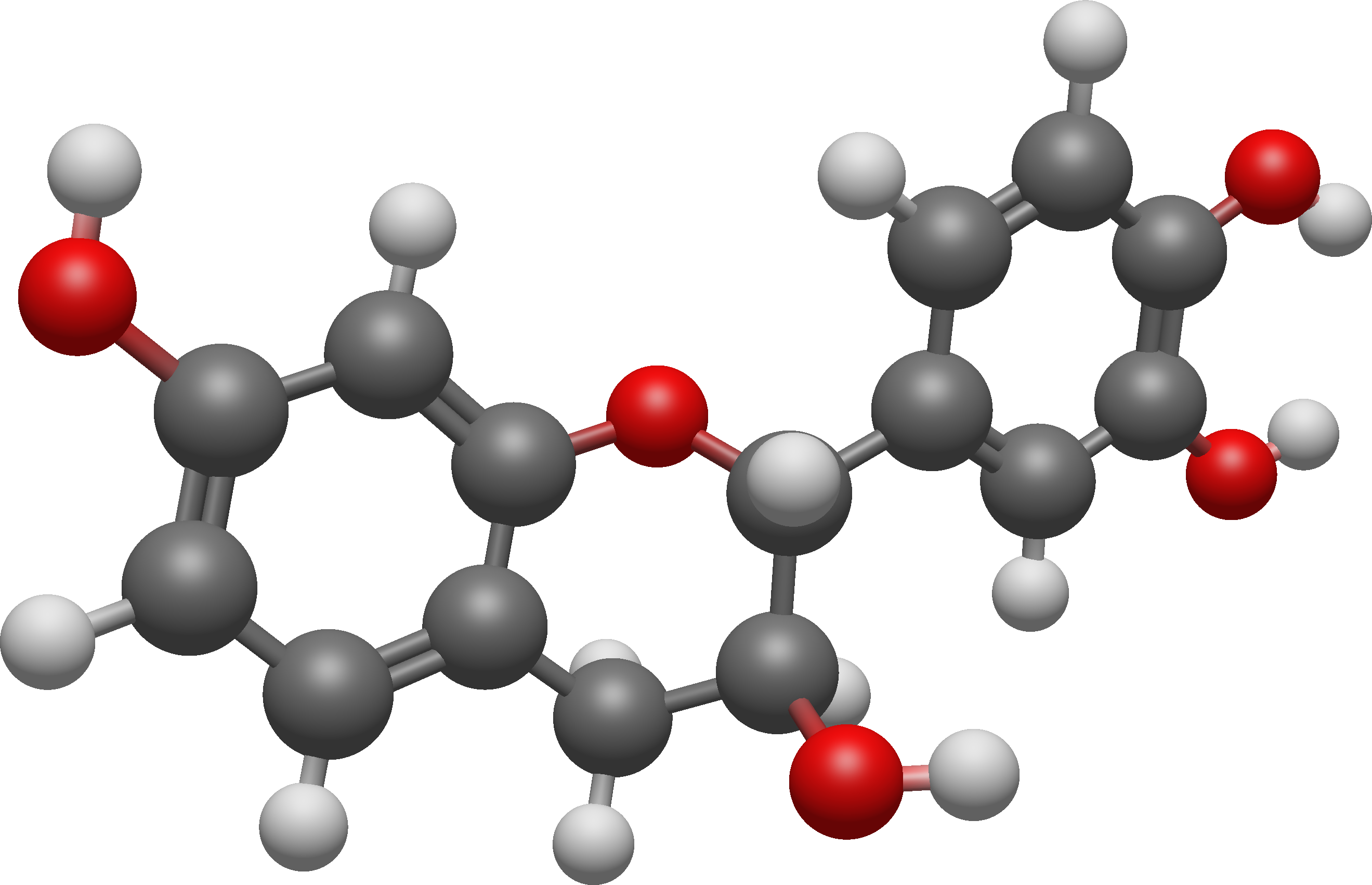
- Chemical structure of fisetinidol

Names
- IUPAC name (2R,3S)-Flavan-3,3′,4′,7-tetrol
- Systematic IUPAC name (2R,3S)-2-(3,4-Dihydroxyphenyl)-3,4-dihydro-2H-1-benzopyran-3,7-diol
- Other names (−)-Fisetinidol

Identifiers
CAS Number	490-49-3
3D model (JSmol)	Interactive image
ChEBI	CHEBI:5066
ChEMBL	ChEMBL3039234
ChemSpider	390840
KEGG	C09735
PubChem CID	442397
CompTox Dashboard (EPA)	DTXSID401028831
- InChI: InChI=1S/C15H14O5/c16-10-3-1-8-5-13(19)15(20-14(8)7-10)9-2-4-11(17)12(18)6-9/h1-4,6-7,13,15-19H,5H2/t13-,15+/m0/s1 Key: VFZYLYJWCROVLO-DZGCQCFKSA-N; InChI=1/C15H14O5/c16-10-3-1-8-5-13(19)15(20-14(8)7-10)9-2-4-11(17)12(18)6-9/h1-4,6-7,13,15-19H,5H2/t13-,15+/m0/s1 Key: VFZYLYJWCROVLO-DZGCQCFKBX
- SMILES: Oc(c3)cc(O1)c(c3)CC(O)C1c(c2)cc(O)c(O)c2

Properties
Chemical formula	C_{15}H_{14}O_{5}
Molar mass	274.26 g/mol
- Except where otherwise noted, data are given for materials in their standard state (at 25 °C [77 °F], 100 kPa). verify (what is ?) Infobox references

Fisetinidol is a flavanol, a type of flavonoid.
