= Anthocyanidin reductase =

Class of enzymes

Identifiers
- EC no.: 1.3.1.77
- CAS no.: 93389-48-1

Databases
- IntEnz: IntEnz view
- BRENDA: BRENDA entry
- ExPASy: NiceZyme view
- KEGG: KEGG entry
- MetaCyc: metabolic pathway
- PRIAM: profile
- PDB structures: RCSB PDB PDBe PDBsum
Search
- PMC: articles
- PubMed: articles
- NCBI: proteins

In enzymology, anthocyanidin reductase (EC 1.3.1.77) is an enzyme that catalyzes the general chemical reaction

an anthocyanidin + 2 NAD(P)H + H^{+}$\rightleftharpoons$ a flavan-3-ol + 2 NAD(P)+

For example, the enzyme converts the anthocyanidin cyanidin to the flavanol (–)-epicatechin by reduction:

cyanidin
+ 2 NADPH
H^{+}
H^{+}
(–)-epicatechin
+ 2 NADP^{+}

In this case, the three substrates of this enzyme are cyanidin, reduced nicotinamide adenine dinucleotide phosphate (NADPH), and a proton. It converts them to (–)-epicatechin and oxidised NADP^{+}. The enzyme from the legume Medicago truncatula can use nicotinamide adenine dinucleotide as an alternative cofactor.

This enzyme belongs to the family of oxidoreductases, specifically those acting on the CH-CH group of donor with NAD+ or NADP+ as acceptor. The systematic name of this enzyme class is flavan-3-ol:NAD(P)+ oxidoreductase. Other names in common use include AtANR, and MtANR. This enzyme participates in flavonoid biosynthesis.
