= Proteracacinidin =

Proteracacinidins are polymeric condensed tannins composed of mesquitol. This type of tannin can be found in hook-thorn tree (Senegalia afra).

The oxidative depolymerization of proteracacinidins yields the anthocyanidin teracacinidin.
