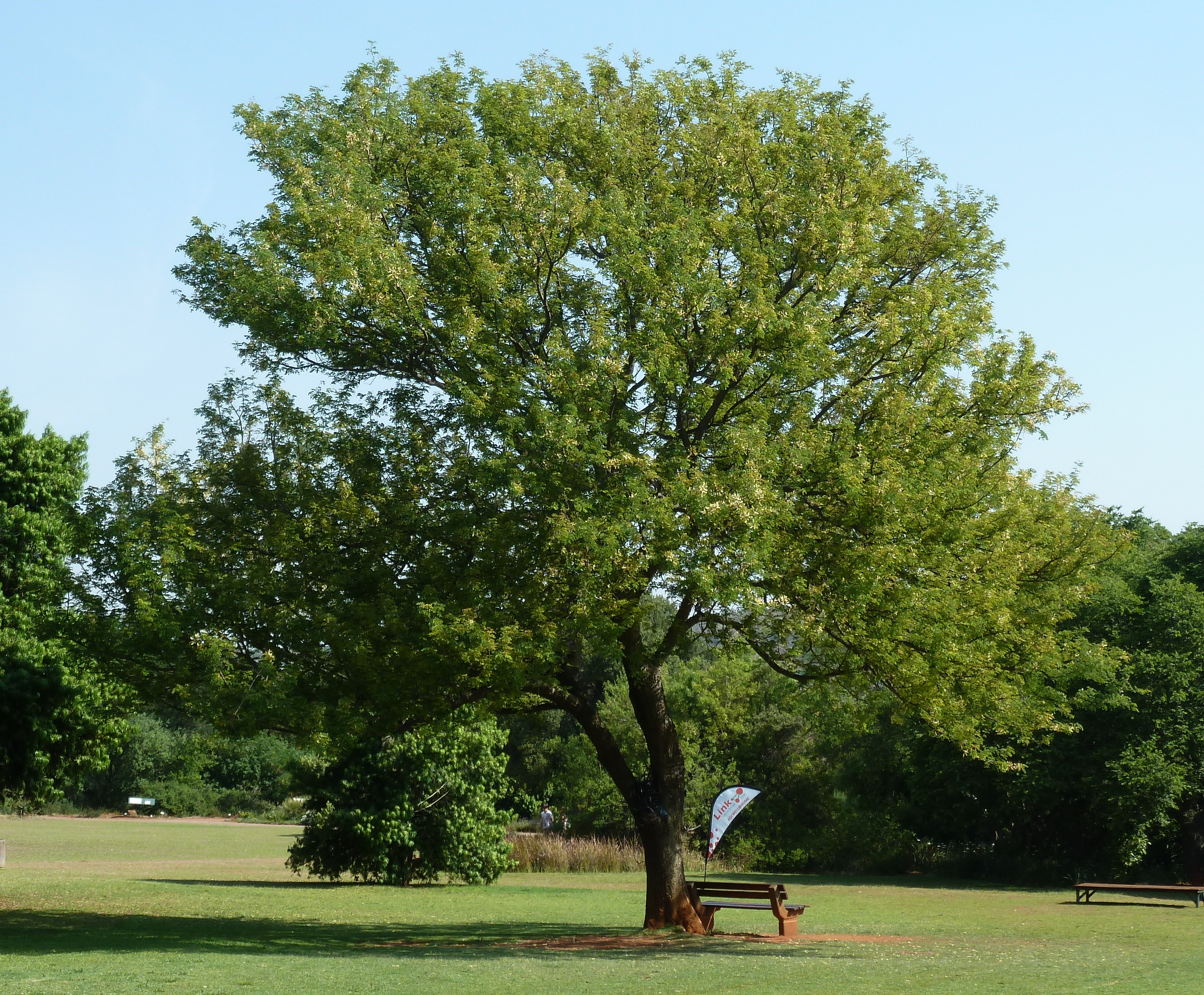

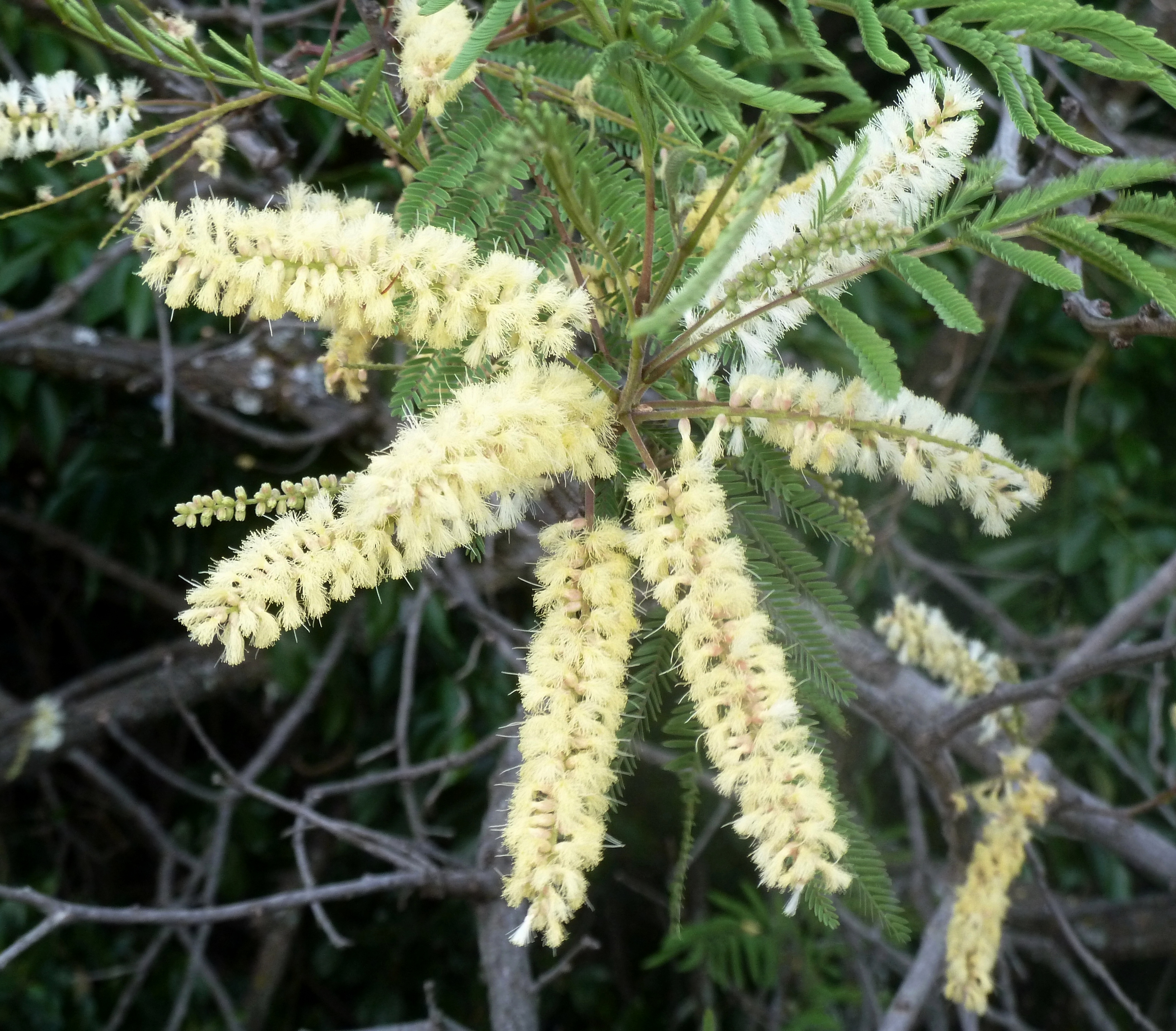
- habit and inflorescences

Conservation status
- Least Concern (IUCN 3.1)

Scientific classification
- Kingdom: Plantae
- Clade: Tracheophytes
- Clade: Angiosperms
- Clade: Eudicots
- Clade: Rosids
- Order: Fabales
- Family: Fabaceae
- Subfamily: Caesalpinioideae
- Clade: Mimosoid clade
- Genus: Senegalia
- Species: S. afra

Binomial name
- Senegalia afra (Thunb.) P.J.H.Hurter & Mabb. (emended)

Synonyms
- Acacia afra (Thunb.) Willd.; var. longa Glover; var. namaquensis Ekl. & Zeyh.; var. tomentosa Glover; var. transvaalensis Glover; Acacia fallax E. Mey.; Acacia multijuga Meissn.; Mimosa afra Thunb.; Acacia caffra; Senegalia caffra

= Senegalia afra =

Species of legume

Senegalia afra, also known as hook-thorn or Acacia afra, is a tree that occurs commonly in southern Africa. Though it is cultivated, it often occurs naturally in Gauteng suburban gardens, together with Acacia karroo and Acacia robusta.

It is up to 10 m (33 ft) tall and may be found in open woodland, grassland, rocky hillsides or watercourses.

== Description ==
It has extremely hard, dense and attractive timber, and is only spared from intense exploitation because of its strongly twisted trunk which does not lend itself to long planks, and its tendency to develop heart rot. The bark is rough, dark grey and flaking, while the strong, paired hooked thorns are a formidable deterrent on young plants. Twigs which may vary in hairiness from densely puberulous to pubescent or tomentose. Due to its variability the species has been described under many names, some being listed below.

Senegalia afra is deciduous and older plants are resistant to frost, fire and drought. Its appearance may be confused with that of Senegalia ataxacantha or with Senegalia hereroensis, though the former has scattered prickles and the latter has more robust prickles. Together with Dombeya rotundifolia and Erythrina lysistemon, this species is one of the earliest to flower in spring, producing strongly scented flower spikes.

== Distribution ==
It occurs in the Transvaal, Eswatini, KwaZulu-Natal, Cape Province and the southern regions of Botswana, Zimbabwe and Mozambique. Senegalia afra was also observed, in 1957, by French researchers in the current Central African Republic.

== Uses ==
Parts of the tree are used by the Bantu in traditional herbal medicine for curing a large range of complaints.

A decoction of the leaves is drunk to treat colds and fever[299]. A leaf decoction, combined with milk, is used as an enema to treat abdominal complaints in children. The leaves are sometimes chewed for the same purpose[299].

A bark infusion is administered as a blood purifier[299].

A number of proteracacinidins (proanthocyanidins) have been isolated from the heartwood, and several cyanogenic glycosides from the leaves[299]

The magical uses in South Africa are numerous. A sprig is placed over a bed to war off evil. It is used in money and love spells and the burned wood stimulates psychic powers

== Chemistry ==
In common with other Acacias and Senegalias, the bark and leaves are rich in tannins such as proteracacinidin.

== Taxonomy ==
The original etymology of its previous species epithet "caffra" is related to kaffir, an ethnic slur used towards black people in Africa. At the July 2024 International Botanical Congress, a vote was held with the result that "caffra" related names will be emended to afra related ones, with the implementation of this happening by the end of July 2024.

== Gallery ==
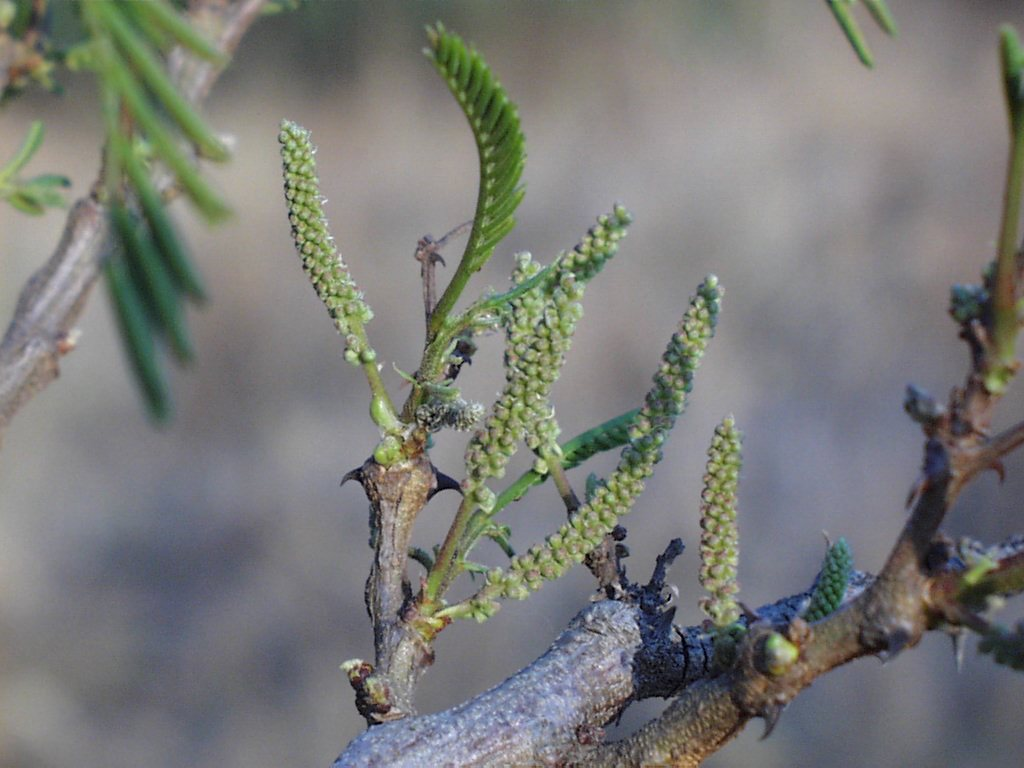
Flower and leaf buds

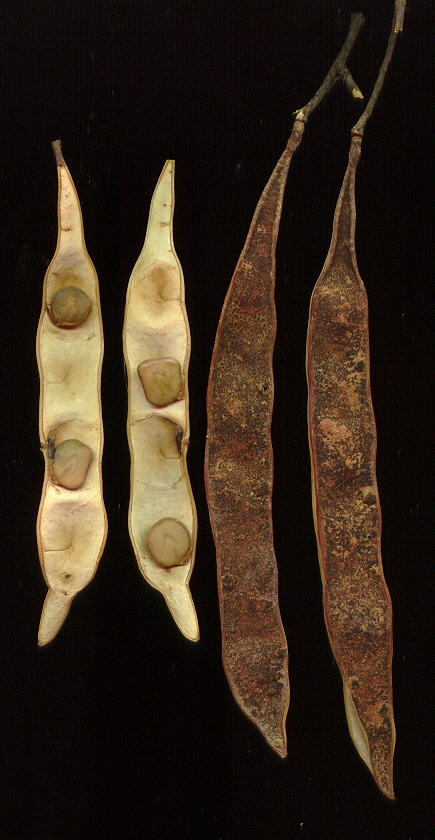
Pods

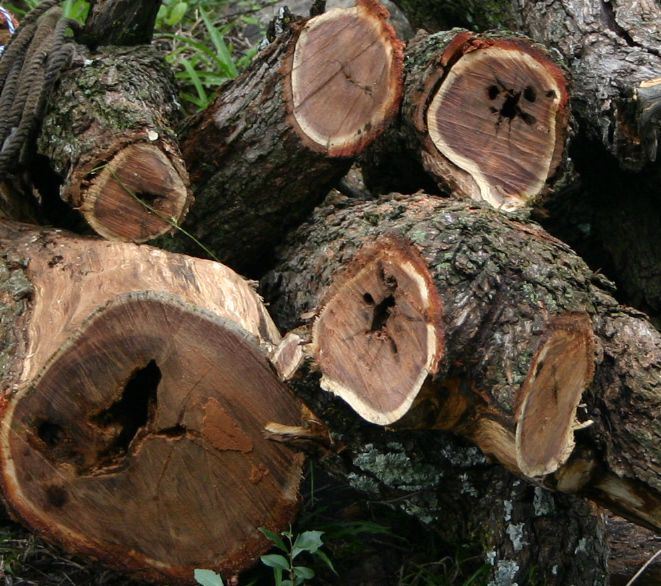
Logs with heart rot

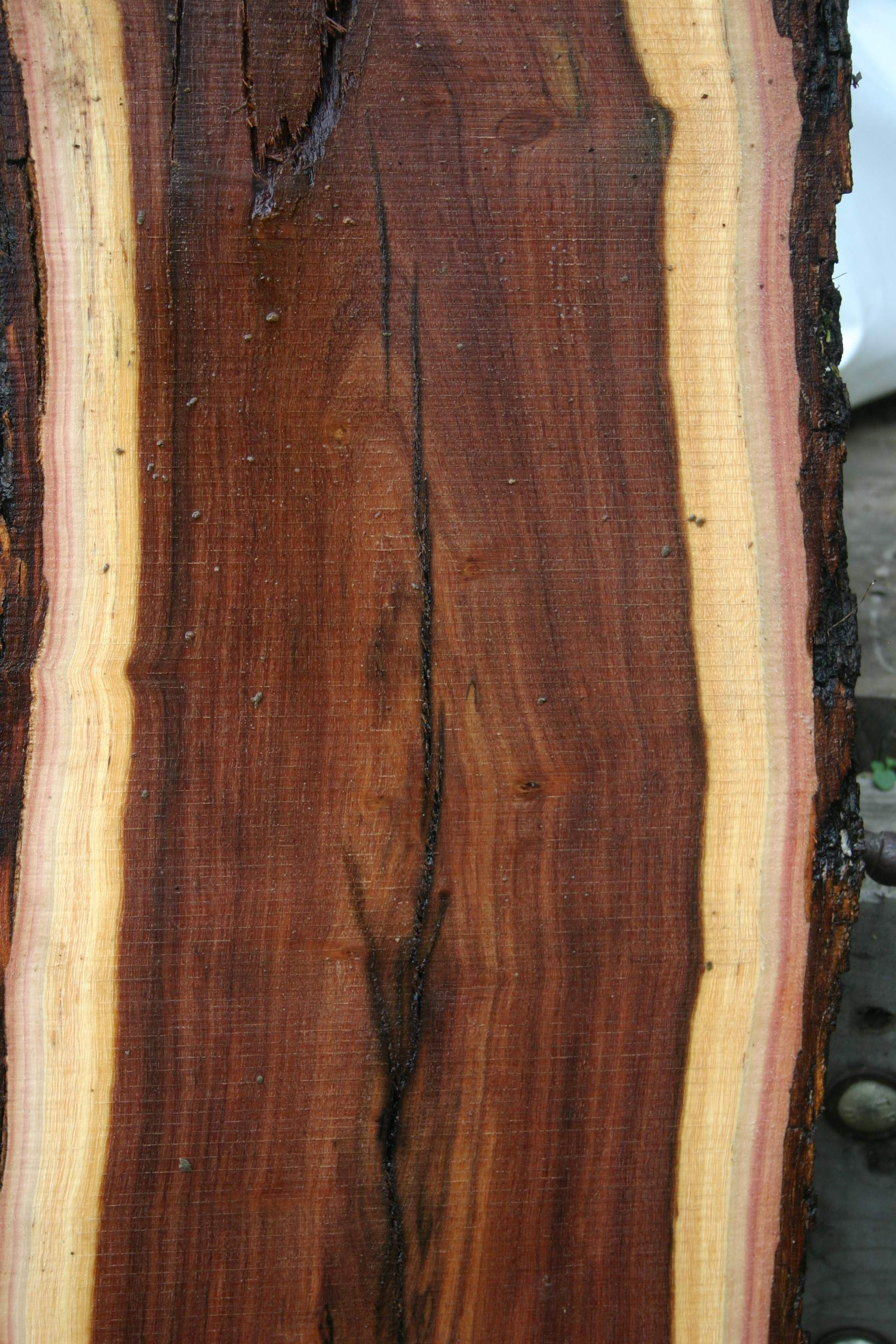
Heartwood/sapwood

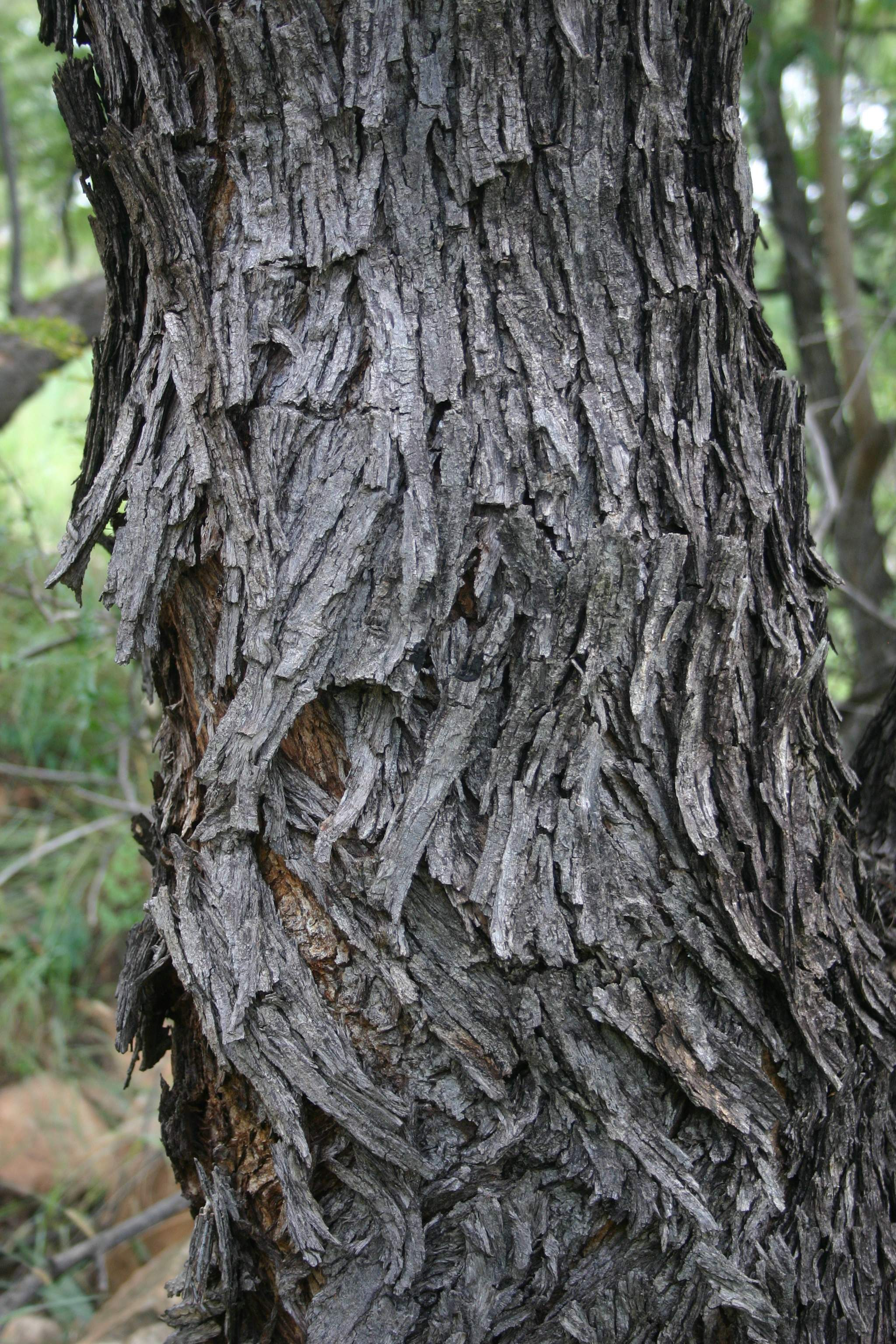
Trunk/bark

== See also ==
- List of Southern African indigenous trees and woody lianes
