= Naturally occurring phenols =

Group of chemical compounds

In biochemistry, naturally occurring phenols are natural products containing at least one phenol functional group. Phenolic compounds are produced by plants and microorganisms. Organisms sometimes synthesize phenolic compounds in response to ecological pressures such as pathogen and insect attack, UV radiation and wounding. As they are present in food regularly consumed by humans and in plants used in the traditional medicine systems of several cultures, their role in human health and disease is a subject of research.

Phenol – the simplest of the phenols

Chemical structure of salicylic acid, the active metabolite of aspirin

Chemical structure of aloe emodin, a diphenol

Quercetin, a typical flavonoid, is a polyphenol

Tannic acid, a typical polyphenol of indeterminate structure

Lignin, is around 25% of the composition of wood This structure is repeated many times in each lignin molecule.

== Classification ==
Various classification schemes can be applied. A commonly used scheme was devised by Jeffrey Harborne et.al in 1964 and published in 1980:

Number of carbon atoms	Basic skeleton	Number of phenolic cycles	Class	Examples
6	C_{6}	1	Simple phenols, Benzoquinones	Catechol, Hydroquinone, 2,6-Dimethoxybenzoquinone
7	C_{6}-C_{1}	1	Phenolic acids, Phenolic aldehydes	Gallic, salicylic acids
8	C_{6}-C_{2}	1	Acetophenones, Tyrosine derivatives, Phenylacetic acids	3-Acetyl-6-methoxybenzaldehyde, Tyrosol, p-Hydroxyphenylacetic acid, Homogentisic acid
9	C_{6}-C_{3}	1	Hydroxycinnamic acids, Allylbenzenes, Coumarins, Isocoumarins, Chromones	Caffeic, ferulic acids, Myristicin, Eugenol, Umbelliferone.
10	C_{6}-C_{4}	1	Naphthoquinones	Juglone, Plumbagin
13	C_{6}-C_{1}-C_{6}	2	Xanthonoids	Mangiferin
14	C_{6}-C_{2}-C_{6}	2	Stilbenoids, Anthraquinones	Resveratrol, Emodin
15	C_{6}-C_{3}-C_{6}	2	Chalconoids, Flavonoids, Isoflavonoids, Neoflavonoids	Quercetin, cyanidin, Genistein
16	C_{6}-C_{4}-C_{6}	2	Halogenated algal phenolic compounds	Kaviol A, colpol
18	(C_{6}-C_{3})_{2}	2	Lignans, Neolignans	Pinoresinol, Eusiderin
30	(C_{6}-C_{3}-C_{6})_{2}	4	Biflavonoids	Amentoflavone
many	(C_{6}-C_{3})_{n}, (C_{6})_{n}, (C_{6}-C_{3}-C_{6})_{n}	n > 12	Lignins, Catechol melanins, Flavolans (Condensed tannins), Polyphenolic proteins, Polyphenols	Raspberry ellagitannin, Tannic acid

C_{6}-C_{7}-C_{6} Diarylheptanoids are not included in this Harborne classification.

They can also be classified on the basis of their number of phenol groups. They can therefore be called simple phenols or monophenols, with only one phenolic group, or di- (bi-), tri- and oligophenols, with two, three or several phenolic groups respectively.

A diverse family natural phenols are the flavonoids, which include several thousand compounds, among them the flavonols, flavones, flavan-3ol (catechins), flavanones, anthocyanidins, and isoflavonoids.

The phenolic unit can be found dimerized or further polymerized, creating a new class of polyphenol. For example, ellagic acid is a dimer of gallic acid and forms the class of ellagitannins, or a catechin and a gallocatechin can combine to form the red compound theaflavin, a process that also results in the large class of brown thearubigins in tea.

Two natural phenols from two different categories, for instance a flavonoid and a lignan, can combine to form a hybrid class like the flavonolignans.

Nomenclature of polymers:

Base Unit:	Gallic Acid	Flavone	Cinnamic acid
Class/Polymer:	Hydrolyzable tannins	Flavonoid, Condensed tannins	Lignins

=== Hybrid chemical classes ===
Plants in the genus Humulus and Cannabis produce terpenophenolic metabolites, compounds that are meroterpenes. Phenolic lipids are long aliphatic chains bonded to a phenolic moiety.

== Chirality ==
Many natural phenols are chiral. An example of such molecules is catechin. Cavicularin is an unusual macrocycle because it was the first compound isolated from nature displaying optical activity due to the presence of planar chirality and axial chirality.

=== UV visible absorbance ===
Natural phenols show optical properties characteristic of benzene, e.g. absorption near 270 nm. According to Woodward's rules, bathochromic shifts often also happen suggesting the presence of delocalised π electrons arising from a conjugation between the benzene and vinyls groups.

As molecules with higher conjugation levels undergo this bathochromic shift phenomenon, a part of the visible spectrum is absorbed. The wavelengths left in the process (generally in red section of the spectrum) recompose the color of the particular substance. Acylation with cinnamic acids of anthocyanidins shifted color tonality (CIE Lab hue angle) to purple.

Here is a series of UV visible spectra of molecules classified from left to right according to their conjugation level:

UV visible spectrum of gallic acid, with lambda max around 270 nanometers (nm)	UV visible spectrum of ferulic acid, with lambda max at 321 and a shoulder at 278 nm.	UV visible spectrum of quercetin, with lambda max at 369 nm.	UV visible spectrum of cyanidin-3-O-glucoside (chrysanthemin), with lambda max at 518 nm.
Chemical structure of gallic acid, a phenolic acid	Chemical structure of ferulic acid, a hydroxycinnamic acid	Chemical structure of quercetin, a flavonol	Chemical structure of cyanidin, an anthocyanidin

The absorbance pattern responsible for the red color of anthocyanins may be complementary to that of green chlorophyll in photosynthetically active tissues such as young Quercus coccifera leaves.

=== Oxidation ===
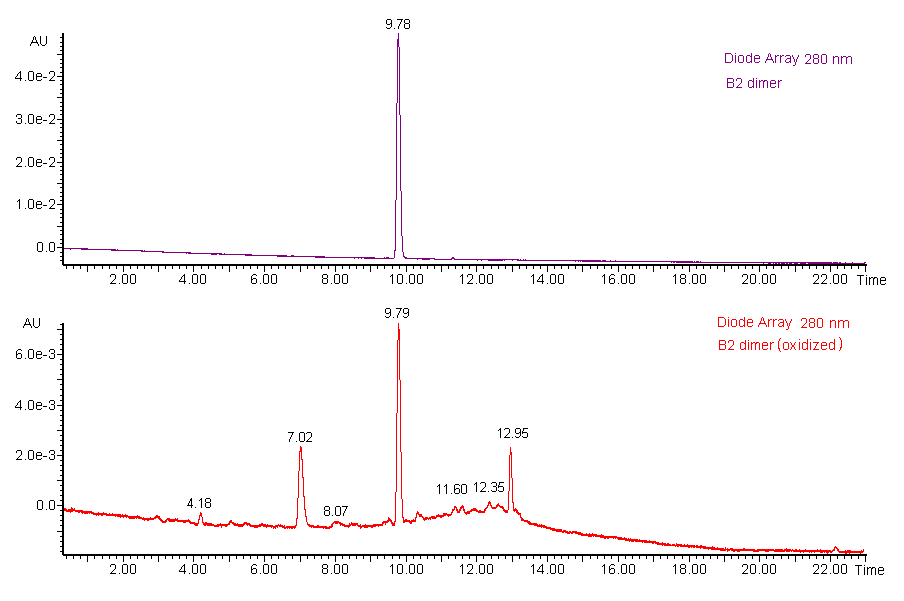
Chromatograms showing the oxidation of a proanthocyanidin B2 dimer. New peaks have appeared in the oxidised sample.

Natural phenols are reactive species toward oxidation, notably the complex mixture of phenolics, found in food for example, can undergo autoxidation during the ageing process. Simple natural phenols can lead to the formation of B type proanthocyanidins in wines or in model solutions. This is correlated to the non-enzymatic browning color change characteristic of this process. This phenomenon can be observed in foods like carrot purees.

Browning associated with oxidation of phenolic compounds has also been given as the cause of cells death in calli formed in in vitro cultures. Those phenolics originate both from explant tissues and from explant secretions.

== Phenolic compounds ==
=== Naturally occurring ===
Cannabinoids	the active constituents of cannabis
Capsaicin	the pungent compound of chili peppers
Carvacrol	found in oregano; antimicrobial and neuroprotectant
Cresol	found in coal tar and creosote
Estradiol	estrogen - hormones
Eugenol	the main constituent of the essential oil of clove
Gallic acid	found in galls
Guaiacol	(2-methoxyphenol) - has a smokey flavor, and is found in roasted coffee, whisky, and smoke
Methyl salicylate	the major constituent of the essential oil of wintergreen
Raspberry ketone	a compound with an intense raspberry smell
Salicylic acid	precursor compound to Aspirin (chemical synthesis is used in manufacturing)
Serotonin / dopamine / adrenaline / noradrenaline	natural neurotransmitters
Thymol	(2-Isopropyl-5-methyl phenol) - found in thyme; an antiseptic that is used in mouthwashes
Tyrosine	an amino acid
Sesamol	a naturally occurring compound found in sesame seeds

== Biosynthesis ==
Phenolics are formed by three different biosynthetic pathways: (i) the shikimate/chorizmate or succinylbenzoate pathway, which produces the phenyl propanoid derivatives (C6–C3); (ii) the acetate/malonate or polyketide pathway, which produces the side-chain-elongated phenyl propanoids, including the large group of flavonoids (C6–C3–C6) and some quinones; and (iii) the acetate/mevalonate pathway, which produces the aromatic terpenoids, mostly monoterpenes, by dehydrogenation reactions. The aromatic amino acid phenylalanine, synthesized in the shikimic acid pathway, is the common precursor of phenol containing amino acids and phenolic compounds.

In plants, the phenolic units are esterified or methylated and are submitted to conjugation, which means that the natural phenols are mostly found in the glycoside form instead of the aglycone form.

In olive oil, tyrosol forms esters with fatty acids. In rye, alkylresorcinols are phenolic lipids.

Some acetylations involve terpenes like geraniol. Those molecules are called meroterpenes (a chemical compound having a partial terpenoid structure).

Methylations can occur by the formation of an ether bond on hydroxyl groups forming O-methylated polyphenols. In the case of the O-methylated flavone tangeritin, all of the five hydroxyls are methylated, leaving no free hydroxyls of the phenol group. Methylations can also occur on directly on a carbon of the benzene ring like in the case of poriol, a C-methylated flavonoid.

== Biodegradation ==
The white rot fungus Phanerochaete chrysosporium can remove up to 80% of phenolic compounds from coking waste water.

== Applications ==
Tannins are used in the tanning industry.

== Aspirational uses ==
Some natural phenols have been proposed as biopesticides. Furanoflavonoids like karanjin or rotenoids are used as acaricide or insecticide.

Some phenols are sold as dietary supplements. Phenols have been investigated as drugs. For instance, Crofelemer (USAN trade name Fulyzaq) is a drug under development for the treatment of diarrhea associated with anti-HIV drugs. Additionally, derivatives have been made of phenolic compound, combretastatin A-4, an anticancer molecule, including nitrogen or halogens atoms to increase the efficacy of the treatment.

== Biomass ==
The recovery of natural phenols from biomass residue is part of biorefining.

=== Analytical methods ===
Studies on evaluating antioxidant capacity can use electrochemical methods.

Detection can be made by recombinant luminescent bacterial sensors.

==== Profiling ====
Phenolic profiling can be achieved with liquid chromatography–mass spectrometry (LC/MS).

==== Quantification ====
A method for phenolic content quantification is volumetric titration. An oxidizing agent, permanganate, is used to oxidize known concentrations of a standard solution, producing a standard curve. The content of the unknown phenols is then expressed as equivalents of the appropriate standard.

Some methods for quantification of total phenolic content are based on colorimetric measurements. Total phenols (or antioxidant effect) can be measured using the Folin-Ciocalteu reaction. Results are typically expressed as gallic acid equivalents (GAE). Ferric chloride (FeCl_{3}) test is also a colorimetric assay.

Lamaison and Carnet have designed a test for the determination of the total flavonoid content of a sample (AlCI_{3} method). After proper mixing of the sample and the reagent, the mixture is incubated for 10 minutes at ambient temperature and the absorbance of the solution is read at 440 nm. Flavonoid content is expressed in mg/g of quercetin.

Quantitation results produced by the means of diode array detector-coupled HPLC are generally given as relative rather than absolute values as there is a lack of commercially available standards for every phenolic molecules. The technique can also be coupled with mass spectrometry (for example, HPLC–DAD–ESI/MS) for more precise molecule identification.

==== Antioxidant effect assessment ====
In vitro measurements

Other tests measure the antioxidant capacity of a fraction. Some make use of the 2,2'-azino-bis(3-ethylbenzothiazoline-6-sulfonic acid) (ABTS) radical cation, which is reactive towards most antioxidants including phenolics, thiols and vitamin C. During this reaction, the blue ABTS radical cation is converted back to its colorless neutral form. The reaction may be monitored spectrophotometrically. This assay is often referred to as the Trolox equivalent antioxidant capacity (TEAC) assay. The reactivity of the various antioxidants tested are compared to that of Trolox, which is a vitamin E analog.

Other antioxidant capacity assays that use Trolox as a standard include the diphenylpicrylhydrazyl (DPPH), oxygen radical absorbance capacity (ORAC), ferric reducing ability of plasma (FRAP) assays or inhibition of copper-catalyzed in vitro human low-density lipoprotein oxidation.

A cellular antioxidant activity (CAA) assay also exists. Dichlorofluorescin is a probe that is trapped within cells and is easily oxidized to fluorescent dichlorofluorescein (DCF). The method measures the ability of compounds to prevent the formation of DCF by 2,2'-Azobis(2-amidinopropane) dihydrochloride (ABAP)-generated peroxyl radicals in human hepatocarcinoma HepG2 cells.

Other methods include butylated hydroxytoluene (BHT), butylated hydroxyanisole (BHA), Rancimat method (rancidification assessment of fat).

In vivo models

Larvae of the model animal Galleria mellonella, also called waxworms, can be used to test the antioxidant effect of individual molecules using boric acid in food to induce an oxidative stress. The content of malondialdehyde, an oxidative stress indicator, and activities of the antioxidant enzymes superoxide dismutase, catalase, glutathione S-transferase and glutathione peroxidase can be monitored. A prophenoloxidase can also be recovered from the insect.

=== Genetic analysis ===
The phenolic biosynthetic and metabolic pathways and enzymes can be studied by means of transgenesis of genes. The Arabidopsis regulatory gene for production of Anthocyanin Pigment 1 (AtPAP1) can be expressed in other plant species.

== Natural occurrences ==
Phenols are found in the natural world, especially in the plant kingdom.

=== Occurrences in prokaryotes ===
Orobol can be found in Streptomyces neyagawaensis (an Actinobacterium). Phenolic compounds can be found in the cyanobacterium Arthrospira maxima, used in the dietary supplement, Spirulina. The three cyanobacteria Microcystis aeruginosa, Cylindrospermopsis raciborskii and Oscillatoria sp. are the subject of research into the natural production of butylated hydroxytoluene (BHT), an antioxidant, food additive and industrial chemical.

The proteobacterium Pseudomonas fluorescens produces phloroglucinol, phloroglucinol carboxylic acid and diacetylphloroglucinol. Another example of phenolics produced in proteobacteria is 3,5-dihydroxy-4-isopropyl-trans-stilbene, a bacterial stilbenoid produced in Photorhabdus bacterial symbionts of Heterorhabditis nematodes.

=== Occurrences in fungi ===
Phenolic acids can be found in mushroom basidiomycetes species. For example, protocatechuic acid and pyrocatechol are found in Agaricus bisporus as well as other phenylated substances like phenylacetic and phenylpyruvic acids. Other compounds like atromentin and thelephoric acid can also be isolated from fungi in the Agaricomycetes class. Orobol, an isoflavone, can be isolated from Aspergillus niger.

In yeasts

Aromatic alcohols (example: tyrosol) are produced by the yeast Candida albicans. They are also found in beer. These molecules are quorum sensing compounds for Saccharomyces cerevisiae.

Metabolism

Aryl-alcohol dehydrogenase uses an aromatic alcohol and NAD^{+} to produce an aromatic aldehyde, NADH and H^{+}.

Aryl-alcohol dehydrogenase (NADP+) uses an aromatic alcohol and NADP^{+} to produce an aromatic aldehyde, NADPH and H^{+}.

Aryldialkylphosphatase (also known as organophosphorus hydrolase, phosphotriesterase, and paraoxon hydrolase) uses an aryl dialkyl phosphate and H_{2}O to produce dialkyl phosphate and an aryl alcohol.

=== Occurrences in lichen ===
Gyrophoric acid, a depside, and orcinol are found in lichen.

=== Occurrence in algae ===
The green alga Botryococcus braunii is the subject of research into the natural production of butylated hydroxytoluene (BHT), an antioxidant, food additive and industrial chemical.

Phenolic acids such as protocatechuic, p-hydroxybenzoic, 2,3-dihydroxybenzoic, chlorogenic, vanillic, caffeic, p-coumaric and salicylic acid, cinnamic acid and hydroxybenzaldehydes such as p-hydroxybenzaldehyde, 3,4-dihydroxybenzaldehyde, vanillin have been isolated from in vitro culture of the freshwater green alga Spongiochloris spongiosa.

Phlorotannins, for instance eckol, are found in brown algae. Vidalenolone can be found in the tropical red alga Vidalia sp.

=== Occurrence in land plants (embryophytes) ===
==== Occurrences in vascular plants ====
Phenolic compounds are mostly found in vascular plants (tracheophytes) i.e. Lycopodiophyta (lycopods), Pteridophyta (ferns and horsetails), Angiosperms (flowering plants or Magnoliophyta) and Gymnosperms (conifers, cycads, Ginkgo and Gnetales).

In ferns, compounds such as kaempferol and its glucoside can be isolated from the methanolic extract of fronds of Phegopteris connectilis or kaempferol-3-O-rutinoside, a known bitter-tasting flavonoid glycoside, can be isolated from the rhizomes of Selliguea feei. Hypogallic acid, caffeic acid, paeoniflorin and pikuroside can be isolated from the freshwater fern Salvinia molesta.

In conifers (Pinophyta), phenolics are stored in polyphenolic parenchyma cells, a tissue abundant in the phloem of all conifers.

The aquatic plant Myriophyllum spicatum produces ellagic, gallic and pyrogallic acids and (+)-catechin.

==== Occurrences in monocotyledons ====
Alkylresorcinols can be found in cereals.

2,4-Bis(4-hydroxybenzyl)phenol is a phenolic compound found in the orchids Gastrodia elata and Galeola faberi.

==== Occurrences in non-vascular plants ====
Phenolics can also be found in non-vascular land plants (bryophytes). Dihydrostilbenoids and bis(dibenzyls) can be found in liverworts (Marchantiophyta), for instance, the macrocycles cavicularin and riccardin C. Though lignin is absent in mosses (Bryophyta) and hornworts (Anthocerotophyta), some phenolics can be found in those two taxa. For instance, rosmarinic acid and a rosmarinic acid 3'-O-β-D-glucoside can be found in the hornwort Anthoceros agrestis.

=== Occurrences in other eukaryotes ===
==== Occurrences in insects ====
The hardening of the protein component of insect cuticle has been shown to be due to the tanning action of an agent produced by oxidation of a phenolic substance forming sclerotin. In the analogous hardening of the cockroach ootheca, the phenolic substance concerned is 3:4-dihydroxybenzoic acid (protocatechuic acid).

Acetosyringone is produced by the male leaffooted bug (Leptoglossus phyllopus) and used in its communication system. Guaiacol is produced in the gut of Desert locusts, Schistocerca gregaria, by the breakdown of plant material. This process is undertaken by the gut bacterium Pantoea agglomerans. Guaiacol is one of the main components of the pheromones that cause locust swarming. Orcinol has been detected in the "toxic glue" of the ant species Camponotus saundersi. Rhynchophorus ferrugineus (red palm weevil) use 2-methoxy-4-vinylphenol for chemical signaling (pheromones). Other simple and complex phenols can be found in eusocial ants (such as Crematogaster) as components of venom.

==== Occurrences in mammals ====
In female elephants, the two compounds 3-ethyl phenol and 2-ethyl 4,5 dimethylphenol have been detected in urine samples. Temporal glands secretion examination showed the presence of phenol, m-cresol and p-cresol (4-methyl phenol) during musth in male elephants.

p-Cresol and o-cresol are also components of the human sweat. P-cresol is also a major component in pig odor.

4-Ethylphenol, 1,2-dihydroxybenzene, 3-hydroxyacetophenone, 4-methyl-1,2-dihydroxybenzene, 4-methoxyacetophenone, 5-methoxysalicylic acid, salicylaldehyde, and 3-hydroxybenzoic acid are components of castoreum, the exudate from the castor sacs of the mature North American beaver (Castor canadensis) and the European beaver (Castor fiber), used in perfumery.

== Roles ==
In some cases of natural phenols, they are present in vegetative foliage to discourage herbivory, such as in the case of Western poison oak.

=== Role in soils ===
In soils, it is assumed that larger amounts of phenols are released from decomposing plant litter rather than from throughfall in any natural plant community. Decomposition of dead plant material causes complex organic compounds to be slowly oxidized lignin-like humus or to break down into simpler forms (sugars and amino sugars, aliphatic and phenolic organic acids), which are further transformed into microbial biomass (microbial humus) or are reorganized, and further oxidized, into humic assemblages (fulvic and humic acids), which bind to clay minerals and metal hydroxides. There has been a long debate about the ability of plants to uptake humic substances from their root systems and to metabolize them. There is now a consensus about how humus plays a hormonal role rather than simply a nutritional role in plant physiology.

In the soil, soluble phenols face four different fates. They might be degraded and mineralized as a carbon source by heterotrophic microorganisms; they can be transformed into insoluble and recalcitrant humic substances by polymerization and condensation reactions (with the contribution of soil organisms); they might adsorb to clay minerals or form chelates with aluminium or iron ions; or they might remain in dissolved form, leached by percolating water, and finally leave the ecosystem as part of dissolved organic carbon (DOC).

Leaching is the process by which cations such as iron (Fe) and aluminum (Al), as well as organic matter, are removed from the litterfall and transported downward into the soil below. This process is known as podzolization and is particularly intense in boreal and cool temperate forests that are mainly constituted by coniferous pines, whose litterfall is rich in phenolic compounds and fulvic acid.

=== Role in survival ===
Phenolic compounds can act as protective agents, inhibitors, natural animal toxicants and pesticides against invading organisms, i.e. herbivores, nematodes, phytophagous insects, and fungal and bacterial pathogens. The scent and pigmentation conferred by other phenolics can attract symbiotic microbes, pollinators and animals that disperse fruits.

==== Defense against predators ====
Volatile phenolic compounds are found in plant resin where they may attract benefactors such as parasitoids or predators of the herbivores that attack the plant.

In the kelp species Alaria marginata, phenolics act as chemical defence against herbivores. In tropical Sargassum and Turbinaria species that are often preferentially consumed by herbivorous fishes and echinoids, there is a relatively low level of phenolics and tannins. Marine allelochemicals generally are present in greater quantity and diversity in tropical than in temperate regions. Marine algal phenolics have been reported as an apparent exception to this biogeographic trend. High phenolic concentrations occur in brown algae species (orders Dictyotales and Fucales) from both temperate and tropical regions, indicating that latitude alone is not a reasonable predictor of plant phenolic concentrations.

==== Defense against infection ====
In Vitis vinifera grape, trans-resveratrol is a phytoalexin produced against the growth of fungal pathogens such as Botrytis cinerea and delta-viniferin is another grapevine phytoalexin produced following fungal infection by Plasmopara viticola. Pinosylvin is a pre-infectious stilbenoid toxin (i.e. synthesized prior to infection), contrary to phytoalexins, which are synthesized during infection. It is present in the heartwood of Pinaceae. It is a fungitoxin protecting the wood from fungal infection.

Sakuranetin is a flavanone, a type of flavonoid. It can be found in Polymnia fruticosa and rice, where it acts as a phytoalexin against spore germination of Pyricularia oryzae. In Sorghum, the SbF3'H2 gene, encoding a flavonoid 3'-hydroxylase, seems to be expressed in pathogen-specific 3-deoxyanthocyanidin phytoalexins synthesis, for example in Sorghum-Colletotrichum interactions.

6-Methoxymellein is a dihydroisocoumarin and a phytoalexin induced in carrot slices by UV-C, that allows resistance to Botrytis cinerea and other microorganisms.

Danielone is a phytoalexin found in the papaya fruit. This compound showed high antifungal activity against Colletotrichum gloesporioides, a pathogenic fungus of papaya.

Stilbenes are produced in Eucalyptus sideroxylon in case of pathogens attacks. Such compounds can be implied in the hypersensitive response of plants. High levels of phenolics in some woods can explain their natural preservation against rot.

In plants, VirA is a protein histidine kinase which senses certain sugars and phenolic compounds. These compounds are typically found from wounded plants, and as a result VirA is used by Agrobacterium tumefaciens to locate potential host organisms for infection.

=== Role in allelopathic interactions ===
Natural phenols can be involved in allelopathic interactions, for example in soil or in water. Juglone is an example of such a molecule inhibiting the growth of other plant species around walnut trees. The aquatic vascular plant Myriophyllum spicatum produces ellagic, gallic and pyrogallic acids and (+)-catechin, allelopathic phenolic compounds inhibiting the growth of blue-green alga Microcystis aeruginosa.

Phenolics, and in particular flavonoids and isoflavonoids, may be involved in endomycorrhizae formation.

Acetosyringone has been best known for its involvement in plant-pathogen recognition, especially its role as a signal attracting and transforming unique, oncogenic bacteria in genus Agrobacterium. The virA gene on the Ti plasmid in the genome of Agrobacterium tumefaciens and Agrobacterium rhizogenes is used by these soil bacteria to infect plants, via its encoding for a receptor for acetosyringone and other phenolic phytochemicals exuded by plant wounds. This compound also allows higher transformation efficiency in plants, in A. tumefaciens mediated transformation procedures, and so is of importance in plant biotechnology.

== Content in human food ==
Notable sources of natural phenols in human nutrition include berries, tea, beer, olive oil, chocolate or cocoa, coffee, pomegranates, popcorn, yerba maté, fruits and fruit based drinks (including cider, wine and vinegar) and vegetables. Herbs and spices, nuts (walnuts, peanut) and algae are also potentially significant for supplying certain natural phenols.

Natural phenols can also be found in fatty matrices like olive oil. Unfiltered olive oil has the higher levels of phenols, or polar phenols that form a complex phenol-protein complex.

Phenolic compounds, when used in beverages, such as prune juice, have been shown to be helpful in the color and sensory components, such as alleviating bitterness.

Some advocates for organic farming claim that organically grown potatoes, oranges, and leaf vegetables have more phenolic compounds and these may provide antioxidant protection against heart disease and cancer. However, evidence on substantial differences between organic food and conventional food is insufficient to support claims that organic food is safer or healthier than conventional food.

=== Human metabolism ===
In animals and humans, after ingestion, natural phenols become part of the xenobiotic metabolism. In subsequent phase II reactions, these activated metabolites are conjugated with charged species such as glutathione, sulfate, glycine or glucuronic acid. These reactions are catalysed by a large group of broad-specificity transferases. UGT1A6 is a human gene encoding a phenol UDP glucuronosyltransferase active on simple phenols. The enzyme encoded by the gene UGT1A8 has glucuronidase activity with many substrates including coumarins, anthraquinones and flavones.
