= Polyphenol =

Class of chemical compounds

Representative chemical structure of one of many plant-derived polyphenols that comprise tannic acid. Such compounds are formed by esterification of phenylpropanoid-derived gallic acid to a monosaccharide (glucose) core.

Polyphenols (/ˌpɒliˈfiːnoʊl, -nɒl/) are a large family of naturally occurring phenols. They are abundant in plants and structurally diverse. Polyphenols include phenolic acids, flavonoids, tannic acid, and ellagitannin, some of which have been used historically as dyes and for tanning garments.

Curcumin, a bright yellow component of turmeric (Curcuma longa), is a well-studied polyphenol.

== Etymology ==
The name derives from the Ancient Greek word πολύς (polus, meaning "many, much") and the word 'phenol' which refers to a chemical structure formed by attachment of an aromatic benzenoid (phenyl) ring to a hydroxyl (-OH) group (hence the -ol suffix). The term "polyphenol" has been in use at least since 1894.

== Definition ==
Ellagic acid, a polyphenol

Polyphenols are natural products with "several hydroxyl groups on aromatic rings", including four principal classes: phenolic acids, flavonoids, stilbenes, and lignans. Flavonoids can be grouped as flavones, flavonols, flavanols, flavanones, isoflavones, proanthocyanidins, and anthocyanins. Particularly abundant flavanoids in foods are catechin (tea, fruits), hesperetin (citrus fruits), cyanidin (red fruits and berries), daidzein (soybean), proanthocyanidins (apple, grape, cocoa), and quercetin (onion, tea, apples). Polyphenols also include phenolic acids, such as caffeic acid, and lignans, which are derived from phenylalanine present in flax seed and cereals.

=== WBSSH definition ===
The White–Bate-Smith–Swain–Haslam (WBSSH) definition characterized structural characteristics common to plant phenolics used in tanning (i.e., the tannins).

In terms of properties, the WBSSH describes the polyphenols as follows:

- generally moderately water-soluble compounds
- with molecular weight of 500–4000 Da
- with >12 phenolic hydroxyl groups
- with 5–7 aromatic rings per 1000 Da

In terms of structures, the WBSSH recognizes two structural family that have these properties:

- proanthocyanidins and its derivatives
- galloyl and hexahydroxydiphenoyl esters and their derivatives

=== Quideau definition ===
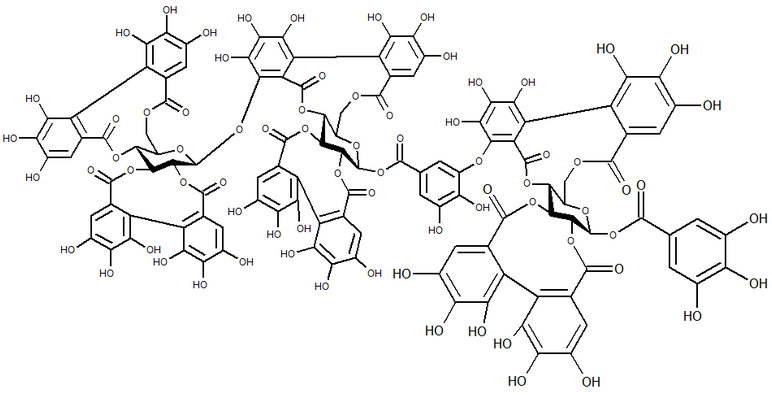
Raspberry ellagitannin, a tannin composed of 14 gallic acid units around a core of three units of glucose, with two gallic acids as simple esters, and the remaining 12 appearing in 6 ellagic acid-type units. Ester, ether, and biaryl linkages are present, see below.

According to Stéphane Quideau, the term "polyphenol" refers to compounds derived from the shikimate/phenylpropanoid and/or the polyketide pathway, featuring more than one phenolic unit and deprived of nitrogen-based functions.

Ellagic acid, a molecule at the core of naturally occurring phenolic compounds of varying sizes, is itself not a polyphenol by the WBSSH definition, but is by the Quideau definition. The raspberry ellagitannin, on the other hand, with its 14 gallic acid moieties (most in ellagic acid-type components), and more than 40 phenolic hydroxyl groups, meets the criteria of both definitions of a polyphenol. Other examples of compounds that fall under both the WBSSH and Quideau definitions include the black tea theaflavin-3-gallate shown below, and the hydrolyzable tannin, tannic acid.

== Chemistry ==
Theaflavin-3-gallate, a plant-derived polyphenol, an ester of gallic acid and a theaflavin core. There are nine phenolic hydroxyl groups and two phenolic ether linkages.

Polyphenols are reactive species toward oxidation, hence their description as antioxidants in vitro.

=== Structure ===
Polyphenols, such as lignin, are larger molecules (macromolecules). Their upper molecular weight limit is about 800 daltons, which allows for the possibility to rapidly diffuse across cell membranes so that they can reach intracellular sites of action or remain as pigments once the cell senesces. Hence, many larger polyphenols are biosynthesized in situ from smaller polyphenols to non-hydrolyzable tannins and remain undiscovered in the plant matrix. Most polyphenols contain repeating phenolic moieties of pyrocatechol, resorcinol, pyrogallol, and phloroglucinol connected by esters (hydrolyzable tannins) or more stable C-C bonds (nonhydrolyzable condensed tannins). Proanthocyanidins are mostly polymeric units of catechin and epicatechin.

The C-glucoside substructure of polyphenols is exemplified by the phenol-saccharide conjugate puerarin, a midmolecular-weight plant natural product. The attachment of the phenol to the saccharide is by a carbon-carbon bond. The isoflavone and its 10-atom benzopyran "fused ring" system, also a structural feature here, is common in polyphenols.

Polyphenols often have functional groups beyond hydroxyl groups. Ether ester linkages are common, as are carboxylic acids.

An example of a synthetically achieved small ellagitannin, tellimagrandin II, derived biosynthetically and sometimes synthetically by oxidative joining of two of the galloyl moieties of 1,2,3,4,6-pentagalloyl-glucose

=== Analytical chemistry ===
The analysis techniques are those of phytochemistry: extraction, isolation, structural elucidation, then quantification.

=== Reactivity ===
Polyphenols readily react with metal ions to form coordination complexes, some of which form metal-phenolic networks.

==== Extraction ====
Extraction of polyphenols can be performed using a solvent like water, hot water, methanol, methanol/formic acid, methanol/water/acetic or formic acid. Liquid–liquid extraction can be also performed or countercurrent chromatography. Solid phase extraction can also be made on C18 sorbent cartridges. Other techniques are ultrasonic extraction, heat reflux extraction, microwave-assisted extraction, critical carbon dioxide, high-pressure liquid extraction or use of ethanol in an immersion extractor. The extraction conditions (temperature, extraction time, ratio of solvent to raw material, particle size of the sample, solvent type, and solvent concentrations) for different raw materials and extraction methods have to be optimized.

Mainly found in the fruit skins and seeds, high levels of polyphenols may reflect only the measured extractable polyphenol (EPP) content of a fruit which may also contain non-extractable polyphenols. Black tea contains high amounts of polyphenol and makes up for 20% of its weight.

Concentration can be made by ultrafiltration. Purification can be achieved by preparative chromatography.

==== Analysis techniques ====
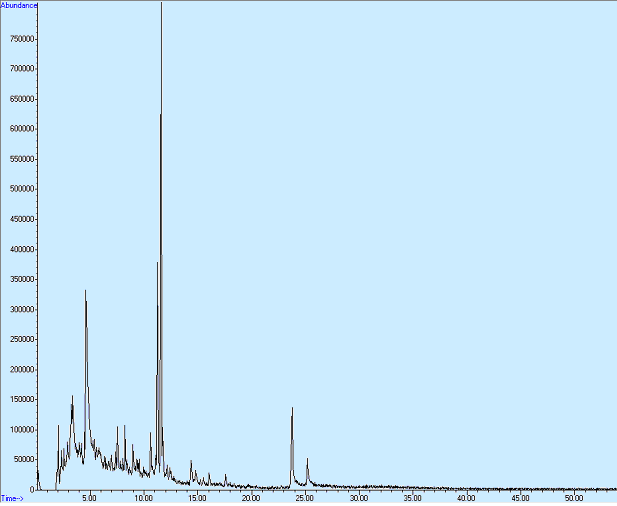
Reversed-phase HPLC plot of separation of phenolic compounds. Smaller natural phenols formed individual peaks while tannins form a hump.

Phosphomolybdic acid is used as a reagent for staining phenolics in thin layer chromatography. Polyphenols can be studied by spectroscopy, especially in the ultraviolet domain, by fractionation or paper chromatography. They can also be analysed by chemical characterisation.

Instrumental chemistry analyses include separation by high performance liquid chromatography (HPLC), and especially by reversed-phase liquid chromatography (RPLC), can be coupled to mass spectrometry.

===== Microscopy analysis =====
The DMACA reagent is an histological dye specific to polyphenols used in microscopy analyses. The autofluorescence of polyphenols can also be used, especially for localisation of lignin and suberin. Where fluorescence of the molecules themselves is insufficient for visualization by light microscopy, DPBA (diphenylboric acid 2-aminoethyl ester, also referred to as Naturstoff reagent A) has traditionally been used, at least in plant science, to enhance the fluorescence signal.

==== Quantification ====
Polyphenolic content in vitro can be quantified by volumetric titration. An oxidizing agent, permanganate, is used to oxidize known concentrations of a standard tannin solution, producing a standard curve. The tannin content of the unknown is then expressed as equivalents of the appropriate hydrolyzable or condensed tannin.

Some methods for quantification of total polyphenol content in vitro are based on colorimetric measurements. Some tests are relatively specific to polyphenols (for instance the Porter's assay). Total phenols (or antioxidant effect) can be measured using the Folin–Ciocalteu reaction. Results are typically expressed as gallic acid equivalents. Polyphenols are seldom evaluated by antibody technologies.

Other tests measure the antioxidant capacity of a fraction. Some make use of the ABTS radical cation which is reactive towards most antioxidants including phenolics, thiols and vitamin C. During this reaction, the blue ABTS radical cation is converted back to its colorless neutral form. The reaction may be monitored spectrophotometrically. This assay is often referred to as the Trolox equivalent antioxidant capacity (TEAC) assay. The reactivity of the various antioxidants tested are compared to that of Trolox, which is a vitamin E analog.

Other antioxidant capacity assays which use Trolox as a standard include the diphenylpicrylhydrazyl (DPPH), oxygen radical absorbance capacity (ORAC), ferric reducing ability of plasma (FRAP) assays or inhibition of copper-catalyzed in vitro human low-density lipoprotein oxidation.

New methods including the use of biosensors can help monitor the content of polyphenols in food.

Quantitation results produced by the mean of diode array detector–coupled HPLC are generally given as relative rather than absolute values as there is a lack of commercially available standards for all polyphenolic molecules.

== Applications ==
Some polyphenols are traditionally used as dyes in leather tanning. For instance, in the Indian subcontinent, pomegranate peel, high in tannins and other polyphenols, or its juice, is employed in the dyeing of non-synthetic fabrics.

Of some interest in the era of silver-based photography, pyrogallol and pyrocatechin are among the oldest photographic developers.

=== Aspirational use as green chemicals ===
Natural polyphenols have long been proposed as renewable precursors to produce plastics or resins by polymerization with formaldehyde, as well as adhesives for particleboards. The aims are generally to make use of plant residues from grape, olive (called pomaces), or pecan shells left after processing.

== Occurrence ==
The most abundant polyphenols are the condensed tannins, found in virtually all families of plants. Larger polyphenols are often concentrated in leaf tissue, the epidermis, bark layers, flowers and fruits but also play important roles in the decomposition of forest litter, and nutrient cycles in forest ecology. Absolute concentrations of total phenols in plant tissues differ widely depending on the literature source, type of polyphenols and assay; they are in the range of 1–25% total natural phenols and polyphenols, calculated with reference to the dry green leaf mass.

Polyphenols are also found in animals. In arthropods, such as insects, and crustaceans polyphenols play a role in epicuticle hardening (sclerotization). The hardening of the cuticle is due to the presence of a polyphenol oxidase. In crustaceans, there is a second oxidase activity leading to cuticle pigmentation. There is apparently no polyphenol tanning occurring in arachnids cuticle.

== Biochemistry ==
Polyphenols are thought to play diverse roles in the ecology of plants. These functions include:

- Release and suppression of growth hormones such as auxin.
- UV screens to protect against ionizing radiation and to provide coloration (plant pigments).
- Deterrence of herbivores (sensory properties).
- Prevention of microbial infections (phytoalexins).
- Signaling molecules in ripening and other growth processes.
- In some woods can explain their natural preservation against rot.

Flax and Myriophyllum spicatum (a submerged aquatic plant) secrete polyphenols that are involved in allelopathic interactions.

=== Biosynthesis and metabolism ===
Polyphenols incorporate smaller parts and building blocks from simpler natural phenols, which originate from the phenylpropanoid pathway for the phenolic acids or the shikimic acid pathway for gallotannins and analogs. Flavonoids and caffeic acid derivatives are biosynthesized from phenylalanine and malonyl-CoA. Complex gallotannins develop through the in vitro oxidation of 1,2,3,4,6-pentagalloylglucose or dimerization processes resulting in hydrolyzable tannins. For anthocyanidins, precursors of the condensed tannin biosynthesis, dihydroflavonol reductase and leucoanthocyanidin reductase (LAR) are crucial enzymes with subsequent addition of catechin and epicatechin moieties for larger, non-hydrolyzable tannins.

The glycosylated form develops from glucosyltransferase activity and increases the solubility of polyphenols.

Polyphenol oxidase (PPO) is an enzyme that catalyses the oxidation of o-diphenols to produce o-quinones. It is the rapid polymerisation of o-quinones to produce black, brown or red polyphenolic pigments that causes fruit browning. In insects, PPO is involved in cuticle hardening.

=== Occurrence in food ===
Polyphenols comprise up to 0.2–0.3% fresh weight for many fruits. Consuming common servings of wine, chocolate, legumes or tea may also contribute to about one gram of intake per day. According to a 2005 review on polyphenols:

The most important food sources are commodities widely consumed in large quantities such as fruit and vegetables, green tea, black tea, red wine, coffee, chocolate, olives, and extra virgin olive oil. Herbs and spices, nuts and algae are also potentially significant for supplying certain polyphenols. Some polyphenols are specific to particular food (flavanones in citrus fruit, isoflavones in soya, phloridzin in apples); whereas others, such as quercetin, are found in all plant products such as fruit, vegetables, cereals, leguminous plants, tea, and wine.

Some polyphenols, such as isoflavones, proanthocyanidins, and ellagitannins, may have antinutrient properties interfering with the absorption of essential nutrients – especially iron and other metallic minerals – by binding to digestive enzymes, particularly in ruminants.

In a comparison of cooking methods, phenolic and carotenoid levels in vegetables were retained better by steaming compared to frying. Polyphenols in wine, beer and various nonalcoholic juice beverages can be removed using finings, substances that are usually added at or near the completion of the processing of brewing.

==== Astringency ====
With respect to food and beverages, the cause of astringency is not fully understood, but it is measured chemically as the ability of a substance to precipitate proteins.

Astringency increases and bitterness decrease with the mean degree of polymerization. For water-soluble polyphenols, molecular weights between 500 and 3000 were reported to be required for protein precipitation. However, smaller molecules might still have astringent qualities likely due to the formation of unprecipitated complexes with proteins or cross-linking of proteins with simple phenols that have 1,2-dihydroxy or 1,2,3-trihydroxy groups. Flavonoid configurations can also cause significant differences in sensory properties, e.g., epicatechin, is more bitter and astringent than its chiral isomer catechin. In contrast, hydroxycinnamic acids do not have astringent qualities, but are bitter.

== Research ==
Polyphenols are a large, diverse group of compounds, which makes it challenging to determine their biological effects. They are not considered nutrients, as they do not contribute to growth, survival, or reproduction, nor do they provide dietary energy. Therefore, they do not have recommended daily intake levels, such as those for macronutrients and micronutrient (vitamins and minerals). In the United States, the Food and Drug Administration issued guidance to manufacturers that polyphenols cannot be mentioned on food labels as antioxidant nutrients unless physiological evidence exists to verify such a qualification and a Dietary Reference Intake value has been established – characteristics which have not been determined for polyphenols.

In the European Union, two health claims were authorized between 2012 and 2015: 1) flavanols in cocoa solids at doses exceeding 200 mg per day may contribute to maintenance of vascular elasticity and normal blood flow; and 2) olive oil polyphenols (5 mg of hydroxytyrosol and its derivatives such as oleuropein complex and tyrosol) may "contribute to the protection of blood lipids from oxidative damage", if consumed daily.

As of 2022, clinical trials that assessed the effect of polyphenol-rich diets on health biomarkers are limited, with results difficult to interpret due to the wide variation of intake values for both individual polyphenols and total polyphenols.

Polyphenols were once considered as antioxidants, but this concept is obsolete. Most polyphenols are metabolized by catechol-O-methyltransferase, and therefore do not have the chemical structure allowing antioxidant activity in vivo; they may exert biological activity as signaling molecules.

=== Cardiovascular diseases ===
In the 1930s, polyphenols (then called vitamin P) were considered as a factor in capillary permeability, followed by various studies through the 21st century of a possible effect on cardiovascular diseases. For most polyphenols, there is no evidence for an effect on cardiovascular regulation, although there are some reviews showing a minor effect of consuming polyphenols, such as chlorogenic acid or flavan-3-ols, on blood pressure.

=== Cancer ===
Higher intakes of soy isoflavones may be associated with reduced risks of breast cancer in postmenopausal women and prostate cancer in men.

A 2019 systematic review found that intake of soy and soy isoflavones is associated with a lower risk of mortality from gastric, colorectal, breast and lung cancers. The study found that an increase in isoflavone consumption by 10 mg per day was associated with a 7% decrease in risk from all cancers, and an increase in consumption of soy protein by 5 grams per day produced a 12% reduction in breast cancer risk.

=== Cognitive function ===
Polyphenols are under preliminary research for possible cognitive effects in healthy adults.

=== Phytoestrogens ===
Isoflavones, which are structurally related to 17β-estradiol, are classified as phytoestrogens. A risk assessment by the European Food Safety Authority found no cause for concern when isoflavones are consumed in a normal diet.

=== Phlebotonic ===
Phlebotonics of heterogeneous composition, consisting partly of citrus peel extracts (flavonoids, such as hesperidin) and synthetic compounds, are used to treat chronic venous insufficiency and hemorrhoids. Some are non-prescription dietary supplements, such as diosmin, while one other – Vasculera (Diosmiplex) – is a prescription medical food intended for treating venous disorders. Their mechanism of action is undefined, and clinical evidence of benefit for using phlebotonics to treat venous diseases is limited.

=== Gut microbiome ===
Polyphenols are extensively metabolized by the gut microbiota and are investigated as a potential metabolic factor in function of the gut microbiota.

=== Toxicity and adverse effects ===
Adverse effects of polyphenol intake range from mild (e.g., gastrointestinal tract symptoms) to severe (e.g., hemolytic anemia or liver failure). In 1988, hemolytic anemia following polyphenol consumption was documented, resulting in the withdrawal of a catechin-containing drug. Polyphenols, particularly in beverages that contain them in high concentrations (tea, coffee, etc), inhibit the absorption of non-haem iron when consumed together in a single meal. Research is limited on the effect of this inhibition on iron status.

Metabolism of polyphenols can result in flavonoid-drug interactions, such as in grapefruit–drug interactions, which involves inhibition of the liver enzyme, CYP3A4, likely by grapefruit furanocoumarins, a class of polyphenol. The European Food Safety Authority established upper limits for some polyphenol-containing supplements and additives, such as green tea extract or curcumin. For most polyphenols found in the diet, an adverse effect beyond nutrient-drug interactions is unlikely.

== See also ==
- List of phytochemicals in food
- Dictionary of natural phenols and polyphenols molecular formulas
- Phytochemistry
- Polyphenolic proteins
- Secondary metabolites
- Wine chemistry
