= Flora of Ezcaray, Valgañón and Zorraquín =

The Flora of Ezcaray, Valgañón and Zorraquín refers to the plant diversity found in the upper Oja basin within the Sierra de La Demanda mountain range, located in La Rioja, Spain.

== Overview ==
The most comprehensive botanical study of this region is Flora y vegetación del Alto Oja (Sierra de La Demanda, La Rioja, España) published in Guineana 11: 1-250 (2005). This study, conducted by the University of the Basque Country, catalogued over 1,000 vascular plant species and subspecies in the upper Oja basin, representing approximately 40% of La Rioja's total flora in just 250 km².

=== Study area characteristics ===
Altitude range: 712 m (Santurde de Rioja) to 2,270 m (San Lorenzo peak) Area: 250 km² Climate: Temperate oceanic, submediterranean type Phytogeographic sector: Oroiberian-Sorian

== Biogeographic characteristics ==
=== Floristic composition ===
The flora includes approximately: European species (especially Atlantic) Mediterranean species (especially western orophytes) Boreal-alpine species (in high altitude areas) Endemic Iberian taxa: Silicicolous Iberian orophilous species and basophilous Pyrenean-Cantabrian species

=== Vegetation series ===
The study identified succession series including: Beech and holly grove series Portuguese oak grove series Pedunculate oak series Marcescent oak series Mixed forest series Holm oak series Willow grove series Juniper series Psychroxerophilous grassland series

== Plant communities by biotope ==
=== Forest biotopes ===
==== Beech forests (Hayedos) ====
European beech (Fagus sylvatica) is dominant in humid, shaded areas at medium-high altitudes.

==== Oak forests ====
The region contains several types of oak forests: Portuguese Oak Forests (Melojares): Extensive forests of Portuguese Oak (Quercus pyrenaica) covering approximately 3 km² near the area. Marcescent Oak Forests (Quejigares): Dominated by Quejigo Oak (Quercus faginea). Pedunculate Oak Forests: Featuring Pedunculate Oak (Quercus robur). Holm Oak Forests (Encinares): Consisting of Holm Oak (Quercus ilex).

==== Holly groves (Acebales) ====
European Holly (Ilex aquifolium) forms notable groves, particularly the Acebal in Valgañón.

==== Mixed forests ====
Hazel (Corylus avellana) Field Maple (Acer campestre) Maguillos (local name) - Pyrus cordata or similar wild fruit trees

==== Juniper woodlands (Enebrales) ====
Common Juniper (Juniperus communis) forms characteristic woodland communities.

==== Riparian forests (Saucedas) ====
Willow (Salix spp.) dominates riparian zones along watercourses.

==== Plantation forests ====
Black Poplar / Lombardy Poplar (Populus nigra / P. nigra 'Italica') Scots Pine (Pinus sylvestris)

=== Shrubland and scrub biotopes ===
==== Rosaceous shrublands ====
Various species of the Rosaceae family form shrubland communities.

==== Genisteae scrublands ====
Broom-type shrubs from the Fabaceae family dominate certain areas.

==== Heathlands (Brezales) ====
Heather species (Erica spp. and Calluna vulgaris) form extensive heathlands.

=== Grassland biotopes ===
==== Mountain meadows and pastures ====
Diverse grass communities adapted to different altitudes.

==== Xerophytic grasslands (Fenalares xéricos) ====
Dry grasslands typical of Mediterranean influence.

==== Ororphilous pastures ====
Mountain pastures at high elevations.

==== Psychroxerophilous grasslands ====
Cold-dry grasslands adapted to extreme conditions.

==== Sedge meadows (Cervunales) ====
High-altitude acidic grasslands dominated by Nardus stricta and related species.

=== Aromatic and medicinal plants ===
These species are characteristic of the region's Mediterranean-influenced areas: Lavender / Spanish Lavender (Lavandula stoechas or L. latifolia) Thyme (Thymus spp.) Hellebore / Heleborine (Helleborus spp.)

=== Scrubland with thyme communities (Tomillares) ===
Various Thymus species dominating rocky, calcareous areas.

== Conservation status ==
The area is part of the Sierra de La Demanda mountain range in the Northern Iberian System and maintains high biodiversity due to: Altitudinal gradient (over 1,500 m elevation difference) Climate diversity (submediterranean with oceanic influence) Mix of siliceous and calcareous substrates Preservation of natural forests

== Medicinal properties of selected species ==
=== Quercus faginea (Portuguese Oak) ===
Quercus faginea Lam., commonly known as Portuguese oak or gall oak, is a deciduous to semi-evergreen species native to the Western Iberian Peninsula and North Africa.

==== Traditional uses ====
In traditional medicine from the Aragonese Pyrenees, Q. faginea (locally called "chaparro") has been used in folk remedies, representing ethnobotanical folklore rather than evidence-based medicine.

==== Phytochemical composition ====
Phenolic compounds and tannins: Q. faginea wood and bark contain significant concentrations of bioactive phenolic compounds. Heartwood contains approximately 558.0 mg gallic acid equivalents (GAE) per gram of extract, with high levels of ellagitannins. Bark contains approximately 630.3 mg GAE/g, with condensed tannins and flavonoids. Antioxidant properties: Wood extracts show IC₅₀ values of 2.6 μg/ml (sapwood) and 3.3 μg/ml (heartwood), comparable to Trolox. Bark extracts demonstrate IC₅₀ values of 2.25–3.01 μg/ml. Lipophilic compounds: The bark's lipophilic extracts contain triterpenes (17.8%), sterols (11.5%), and fatty acids (27.8%).

==== Potential medicinal applications ====
Based on its chemical composition, Q. faginea may share therapeutic properties with other Quercus species. Key triterpenes identified include betulinic acid (anti-inflammatory, potential antitumor properties), ursolic acid (anti-inflammatory, antimicrobial activities), and β-sitosterol (cholesterol-lowering effects).

==== Research status ====
While Q. faginea exhibits promising phytochemical profiles, direct clinical research remains limited. Most research has focused on its use in cooperage and as a natural antioxidant source.

=== Acer campestre (Field Maple) ===
==== Recent studies and evidence ====
A 2020 study titled "Pharmacognostical Studies on Acer campestre L. subsp. campestre" investigated leaves, branches and maple syrup derivatives. Alcoholic extracts and ethyl acetate subextracts showed the greatest free radical scavenging capacities. Alcoholic extracts showed activity against Candida albicans, Escherichia coli and Pseudomonas aeruginosa.

==== Bioactive compounds ====
Identified compounds include total phenols, flavonoids, catechic tannins, and specific phenolic acids such as gallic, caffeic, protocatechuic, chlorogenic, and p-coumaric acids. Saponins have also been detected qualitatively.

==== Antioxidant activity ====
IC₅₀ values in DPPH assays for alcoholic extracts of A. campestre show strong radical scavenging activity, with some extracts producing approximately 88-91% radical capture at relatively low concentrations.

==== Antimicrobial activity ====
Alcoholic extracts showed activity against Candida albicans, Escherichia coli and Pseudomonas aeruginosa. Leaf extracts inhibited bacterial growth with minimum inhibitory concentrations between 0.3-8.0 mg/mL, showing greater effectiveness against Gram-positive bacteria.

==== Important limitations ====
There is significant
