= 2,2'-Azobis(2-amidinopropane) dihydrochloride =

Names
- IUPAC name (1Z,1'Z)-2,2'-[(E)-1,2-Diazenediyl]bis(2-methylpropanimidamide) dihydrochloride
- Other names AAPH; AMPA; 2,2'-Azobisisobutyramidinium chloride

Identifiers
CAS Number	2997-92-4
3D model (JSmol)	Interactive image
ChemSpider	68821
PubChem CID	84924
UNII	7381JDR72F
CompTox Dashboard (EPA)	DTXSID1065893
- InChI: InChI=1S/C8H18N6.2ClH/c1-7(2,5(9)10)13-14-8(3,4)6(11)12;;/h1-4H3,(H3,9,10)(H3,11,12);2*1H/b14-13+ Key: LXEKPEMOWBOYRF-QDBORUFSSA-N
- SMILES: Cl.Cl.[N@H]=C(N)C(/N=N/C(C(=[N@H])N)(C)C)(C)C

Properties
Chemical formula	C_{8}H_{20}Cl_{2}N_{6}
Molar mass	271.19 g·mol^{−1}
- Except where otherwise noted, data are given for materials in their standard state (at 25 °C [77 °F], 100 kPa). Infobox references

2,2'-Azobis(2-amidinopropane) dihydrochloride (abbreviated AAPH or AMPA) is a chemical compound used to study the chemistry of the oxidation of drugs.

It is a free radical-generating azo compound. It is gaining prominence as a model oxidant in small molecule and protein therapeutics for its ability to initiate oxidation reactions via both nucleophilic and free radical mechanisms.

2,2′-azobis (2-amidinopropane) dihydrochloride has been used in experiments on linoleic acid subjected to induced oxidation with different combinations of binary mixtures of natural phenolics. The experiments show that some binary mixtures can lead to a synergetic antioxidant effect while other mixtures lead to an antagonistic effect.
