= Antagonism (chemistry) =

Chemical antagonists impede the normal function of a system. They function to invert the effects of other molecules. The effects of antagonists can be seen after they have encountered an agonist, and as a result, the effects of the agonist is neutralized. Antagonists such as dopamine antagonist slow down movement in lab rats. Although they hinder the joining of enzymes to substrates, Antagonists can be beneficial. For example, not only do angiotensin receptor blockers, and angiotensin-converting enzyme (ACE) inhibitors work to lower blood pressure, but they also counter the effects of renal disease in diabetic and non-diabetic patients. Chelating agents, such as edetate calcium disodium, fall into the category of antagonists and operate to minimize the lethal effects of heavy metals such as mercury or lead.

In chemistry, antagonism is a phenomenon wherein two or more agents in combination have an overall effect that is less than the sum of their individual effects.

The word is most commonly used in this context in biochemistry and toxicology: interference in the physiological action of a chemical substance by another having a similar structure. For instance, a receptor antagonist is an agent that reduces the response that a ligand produces when the receptor antagonist binds to a receptor on a cell. An example of this is the interleukin-1 receptor antagonist. The opposite of antagonism is synergy. It is a negative type of synergism.

Experiments with different combinations show that binary mixtures of phenolics can lead to either a synergetic antioxidant effect or to an antagonistic effect.
