= List of antioxidants in food =

This is a list of antioxidants naturally occurring in food. Vitamin C and vitamin E – which are ubiquitous among raw plant foods – are confirmed as dietary antioxidants, whereas vitamin A becomes an antioxidant following metabolism of provitamin A beta-carotene and cryptoxanthin. Most food compounds listed as antioxidants – such as polyphenols common in colorful, edible plants – have antioxidant activity only in vitro, as their fate in vivo is to be rapidly metabolized and excreted, and the in vivo properties of their metabolites remain poorly understood. For antioxidants added to food to preserve them, see butylated hydroxyanisole and butylated hydroxytoluene.

== Regulatory guidance ==
In the following discussion, the term "antioxidant" refers mainly to non-nutrient compounds in foods, such as polyphenols, which have antioxidant capacity in vitro and so provide an artificial index of antioxidant strength – the oxygen radical absorbance capacity (ORAC) measurement. Other than for dietary antioxidant vitamins – vitamin A, vitamin C, and vitamin E – no food compounds have been proved to be antioxidants in vivo. Accordingly, regulatory agencies such as the Food and Drug Administration of the United States and the European Food Safety Authority (EFSA) have published guidance disallowing food product labels to claim an inferred antioxidant benefit when no such physiological evidence exists.

== Physiological context ==
Despite the above discussion implying that ORAC-rich foods with polyphenols may provide antioxidant benefits when in the diet, there remains no physiological evidence that any polyphenols have such actions or that ORAC has any relevance in the human body.

On the contrary, research indicates that although polyphenols are antioxidants in vitro, antioxidant effects in vivo are probably negligible or absent. By non-antioxidant mechanisms still undefined, polyphenols may affect mechanisms of cardiovascular disease or cancer.

The increase in antioxidant capacity of blood seen after the consumption of polyphenol-rich (ORAC-rich) foods is not caused directly by the polyphenols, but most likely results from increased uric acid levels derived from metabolism of flavonoids. According to Frei, "we can now follow the activity of flavonoids in the body, and one thing that is clear is that the body sees them as foreign compounds and is trying to get rid of them." Another mechanism may be the increase in activities of paraoxonases by dietary antioxidants that can reduce oxidative stress.

== Vitamins ==
- Vitamin A (retinol), also synthesized by the body from beta-carotene, protects dark green, yellow, and orange vegetables and fruits from solar radiation damage, and is thought to play a similar role in the human body. Carrots, squash, broccoli, sweet potatoes, tomatoes (which gain their color from the compound lycopene), kale, mangoes, oranges, seabuckthorn berries, wolfberries (goji), collards, cantaloupe, peaches, and apricots are particularly rich sources of beta-carotene, the major provitamin A carotenoid.
- Vitamin C (ascorbic acid) is a water-soluble compound that fulfills several roles in living systems. Sources include citrus fruits (such as oranges, sweet lime, etc.), green peppers, broccoli, green leafy vegetables, black currants, strawberries, blueberries, seabuckthorn, raw cabbage, and tomatoes.
- Vitamin E, including tocotrienol and tocopherol, is fat soluble and protects lipids. Sources include wheat germ, seabuckthorn, nuts, seeds, whole grains, green leafy vegetables, kiwifruit, vegetable oil, and fish-liver oil. Alpha-tocopherol is the main form in which vitamin E is consumed. Recent studies showed that some tocotrienol isomers have significant anti-oxidant properties.

== Vitamin cofactors and minerals ==
- Coenzyme Q10
- Manganese, particularly when in its +2 valence state as part of the enzyme called superoxide dismutase (SOD)
- Iodide

== Hormones ==
- Melatonin

== Carotenoid terpenoids ==
- Alpha-carotene - found in carrots, winter squash, tomatoes, green beans, cilantro, Swiss chard
- Astaxanthin - found naturally in red algae and animals higher in the marine food chain. It is a red pigment familiarly recognized in crustacean shells as well as salmon flesh and roe
- Beta-carotene - found in high concentrations in butternut squash, carrots, orange bell peppers, pumpkins, kale, peaches, apricots, mango, turnip greens, broccoli, spinach, and sweet potatoes
- Canthaxanthin
- Cryptoxanthin - present in papaya, egg yolk, butter, apples
- Lutein - found in high concentration in spinach, kale, Swiss chard, collard greens, beet and mustard greens, endive, red pepper, and okra
- Lycopene - found in high concentration in cooked red tomato products such as canned tomatoes, tomato sauce, tomato juice and garden cocktails, guava, and watermelons.
- Zeaxanthin - best sources are kale, collard greens, spinach, turnip greens, Swiss chard, mustard and beet greens, corn, and broccoli

== Polyphenols ==
Natural phenols are a class of molecules found in abundance in plants. Many common foods contain rich sources of polyphenols that have antioxidant properties only in test tube studies. As interpreted by the Linus Pauling Institute, dietary polyphenols have little or no direct antioxidant food value following digestion. Not like controlled test tube conditions, the fate of flavones or polyphenols in vivo shows they are poorly absorbed and poorly conserved (less than 5%), so that most of what is absorbed exists as metabolites modified during digestion, destined for rapid excretion.

Spices, herbs, and essential oils are rich in polyphenols in the plant itself and shown with antioxidant potential in vitro. Red wine is high in total polyphenol count that supplies antioxidant quality that is unlikely to be conserved following digestion (see section below).

Deeply pigmented fruits such as cranberries, blueberries, plums, blackberries, raspberries, strawberries, blackcurrants, and other fruits such as figs, cherries, guava, oranges, mango, grape juice, and pomegranate juice also have significant polyphenol content.

Sorghum bran, cocoa powder, and cinnamon are rich sources of procyanidins, which are large molecular weight compounds found in many fruits and some vegetables. Partly due to the large molecular weight (size) of these compounds, their amount absorbed in the body is low, however, an effect also resulting from the action of stomach acids, enzymes, and bacteria in the gastrointestinal tract where smaller derivatives are metabolized and excreted.

=== Flavonoids ===
Flavonoids, a subset of polyphenol antioxidants, are present in many berries, as well as in coffee and tea. Examples:

- Myricetin - walnuts are a rich source
- Isoflavone phytoestrogens - found primarily in soy, peanuts, and other members of the family Fabaceae
- Resveratrol - found in the skins of dark-colored grapes, and concentrated in red wine
- Pterostilbene - methoxylated analogue of resveratrol, abundant in Vaccinium berries

=== Phenolic acids and their esters ===
Examples:

- Chicoric acid - another caffeic acid derivative, is found in chicory and Echinacea
- Chlorogenic acid - found in high concentration in coffee (more concentrated in robusta than arabica beans), blueberries, and tomatoes - produced from esterification of caffeic acid
- Cinnamic acid and its derivatives, such as ferulic acid - found in seeds of plants such as in brown rice, whole wheat, and oats, as well as in coffee, apple, artichoke, peanut, orange, and pineapple.
- Ellagic acid - found in high concentration in raspberry and strawberry, and in ester form in barrel-aged alcohol such as red wine and whisky
- Ellagitannins - hydrolysable tannin polymer formed when ellagic acid, a polyphenol monomer, esterifies and binds with the hydroxyl group of a polyol carbohydrate such as glucose
- Gallic acid - found in gallnuts, sumac, witch hazel, tea leaves, oak bark, and many other plants
- Rosmarinic acid - found in high concentration in rosemary, oregano, lemon balm, sage, and marjoram
- Salicylic acid - found in most vegetables, fruits, and herbs; but most abundantly in the bark of willow trees, from where it was extracted for use in the early manufacture of aspirin

=== Other nonflavonoid phenolics ===
- Curcumin - Curcumin has low bioavailability, because, much of it is excreted through glucuronidation, however, bioavailability is substantially enhanced by solubilization in a lipid (oil or lecithin) or by heat
- Flavonolignans - e.g. silymarin - a mixture of flavonolignans extracted from milk thistle

== Other compounds ==
- Capsaicin, the active component of chili peppers
- Bilirubin, a breakdown product of blood, has been identified as a possible antioxidant
- Citric acid, oxalic acid, and phytic acid
- N-Acetylcysteine, water-soluble
- R-α-Lipoic acid, fat- and water-soluble

== See also ==
- Antioxidant
- Colour retention agent
- Nutrition
- Polyphenol antioxidant
- Free radical
