= MPN =

MPN may refer to:

- Manufacturer part number, an identifier
- Master promissory note, a wide-encompassing accounting contract
- Metal-phenolic network, a supramolecular coordination structure consisting of metal ions and polyphenols
- Microsoft Partner Network, a network of Microsoft partner companies and vendors
- MintPress News, an American left-wing news website
- Mobil Producing Nigeria, a Nigerian petroleum company
- Most probable number, a method for estimating counts from positive/negative data
- Movimiento Popular Neuquino, a provincial political party in the province of Neuquén, Argentina
- Mutual Progressive Network, a 1970s US radio network
- Myeloproliferative neoplasms, a family of blood cancers in which excess cells are produced
- RAF Mount Pleasant (IATA airport code), a British military base in the Falkland Islands
