= ABTS =

Names
- IUPAC name 2,2'-Azino-bis(3-ethylbenzothiazoline-6-sulfonic acid)

Identifiers
CAS Number	28752-68-3; 30931-67-0 diammonium salt
3D model (JSmol)	Interactive image; Interactive image
ChemSpider	4576521
PubChem CID	5464076
CompTox Dashboard (EPA)	DTXSID10894755
- InChI: InChI=1S/C18H18N4O6S4/c1-3-21-13-7-5-11(31(23,24)25)9-15(13)29-17(21)19-20-18-22(4-2)14-8-6-12(32(26,27)28)10-16(14)30-18/h5-10H,3-4H2,1-2H3,(H,23,24,25)(H,26,27,28)/b19-17-,20-18+ Key: ZTOJFFHGPLIVKC-YAFCTCPESA-N; InChI=1/C18H18N4O6S4/c1-3-21-13-7-5-11(31(23,24)25)9-15(13)29-17(21)19-20-18-22(4-2)14-8-6-12(32(26,27)28)10-16(14)30-18/h5-10H,3-4H2,1-2H3,(H,23,24,25)(H,26,27,28)/b19-17-,20-18+ Key: ZTOJFFHGPLIVKC-YAFCTCPEBW
- SMILES: CCN1/C(Sc2cc(ccc12)S(O)(=O)=O)=N/N=C/3Sc4cc(ccc4N3CC)S(O)(=O)=O; O=S(=O)(O)c1ccc2N(C(\Sc2c1)=N\N=C4\Sc3cc(ccc3N4CC)S(=O)(=O)O)CC

Properties
Chemical formula	C_{18}H_{18}N_{4}O_{6}S_{4}
Molar mass	514.60 g·mol^{−1}

Hazards
- GHS labelling
Pictograms	(GHS07: Exclamation mark)
Signal word	Warning
Hazard statements	H315, H319, H335
- Except where otherwise noted, data are given for materials in their standard state (at 25 °C [77 °F], 100 kPa). Infobox references

In biochemistry, ABTS (2,2'-azino-bis(3-ethylbenzothiazoline-6-sulfonic acid)) is a chemical compound used to observe the reaction kinetics of specific enzymes. A common use for it is in the enzyme-linked immunosorbent assay (ELISA) to detect the binding of molecules to each other.

It is commonly used as a substrate with hydrogen peroxide for a peroxidase enzyme (such as horseradish peroxidase) or alone with blue multicopper oxidase enzymes (such as laccase or bilirubin oxidase). Its use allows the reaction kinetics of peroxidases themselves to be followed. In this way it also can be used to indirectly follow the reaction kinetics of any hydrogen peroxide-producing enzyme, or to simply quantify the amount of hydrogen peroxide in a sample.

The formal reduction potentials for ABTS are high enough for it to act as an electron donor for the reduction of oxo species such as molecular oxygen and hydrogen peroxide, particularly at the less-extreme pH values encountered in biological catalysis. Under these conditions, the sulfonate groups are fully deprotonated and the mediator exists as a dianion.

ABTS^{–·} + e^{–} → ABTS^{2–} E°′ = 0.67 V vs SHE
ABTS + e^{–} → ABTS^{–·} E°′ = 1.08 V vs SHE

This compound is chosen because the enzyme facilitates the reaction with hydrogen peroxide, turning it into a green and soluble end-product. Its new absorbance maximum of 420 nm light (ε = 3.6 × 10^{4} M^{–1} cm^{–1}) can easily be followed with a spectrophotometer, a common laboratory instrument. It is sometimes used as part of a glucose estimating reagent when finding glucose concentrations of solutions such as blood serum.

ABTS is also frequently used by the food industry and agricultural researchers to measure the antioxidant capacities of foods. In this assay, ABTS is converted to its radical cation by addition of sodium persulfate. This radical cation is blue in color and absorbs light at 415, 645, 734 and 815 nm. The ABTS radical cation is reactive towards most antioxidants including phenolics, thiols and Vitamin C. During this reaction, the blue ABTS radical cation is converted back to its colorless neutral form. The reaction may be monitored spectrophotometrically. This assay is often referred to as the Trolox equivalent antioxidant capacity (TEAC) assay. The reactivity of the various antioxidants tested are compared to that of Trolox, which is a water-soluble analog of vitamin E.

== Applications for functional food analysis ==
Based on the special chemical properties of formed free radicals, ABTS assay has been used to determine the antioxidant capacity of food products. For example, polyphenol compounds, which widely exist in fruit, can quench free radicals inside human body, thus prevent oxidative damage by free radicals. The antioxidant potency of plant extract or food product has been measured by ABTS assay. One example with detailed method is the antioxidant activity analysis of Hibiscus products.
