= Dichlorofluorescein =

Names
- Preferred IUPAC name 2′,7′-Dichloro-3′,6′-dihydroxy-3H-spiro[[2]benzofuran-1,9′-xanthen]-3-one

Identifiers
CAS Number	76-54-0
3D model (JSmol)	Interactive image
ChEBI	CHEBI:51596
ChEMBL	ChEMBL1908059
ChemSpider	58471
ECHA InfoCard	100.000.881
PubChem CID	64944
UNII	56NQM5UZT1
CompTox Dashboard (EPA)	DTXSID8058798
- InChI: InChI=1S/C20H10Cl2O5/c21-13-5-11-17(7-15(13)23)26-18-8-16(24)14(22)6-12(18)20(11)10-4-2-1-3-9(10)19(25)27-20/h1-8,23-24H Key: VFNKZQNIXUFLBC-UHFFFAOYSA-N; InChI=1/C20H10Cl2O5/c21-13-5-11-17(7-15(13)23)26-18-8-16(24)14(22)6-12(18)20(11)10-4-2-1-3-9(10)19(25)27-20/h1-8,23-24H Key: VFNKZQNIXUFLBC-UHFFFAOYAO; InChI=1S/C20H10Cl2O5/c21-13-5-11-17(7-15(13)23)26-18-8-16(24)14(22)6-12(18)20(11)10-4-2-1-3-9(10)19(25)27-20/h1-8,23-24H Key: VFNKZQNIXUFLBC-UHFFFAOYSA-N
- SMILES: Clc5cc4c(Oc1cc(O)c(Cl)cc1C34OC(=O)c2c3cccc2)cc5O

Properties
Chemical formula	C_{20}H_{10}Cl_{2}O_{5}
Molar mass	401.20 g·mol^{−1}
- Except where otherwise noted, data are given for materials in their standard state (at 25 °C [77 °F], 100 kPa). verify (what is ?) Infobox references

Dichlorofluorescein (DCF) is an organic dye of the fluorescein family, being substituted at the 2 and 7 positions by chloride.

It is used as an indicator for argentometry by Fajans method.

When used as an indicator, upon reaching the equivalence point of a titration reaction the color shifts from colorless towards a faint pink.

It is also used in the cellular antioxidant activity (CAA) assay. Dichlorofluorescin (DCFH) is a probe that is trapped within cells and is easily oxidized to fluorescent dichlorofluorescein (DCF). The method measures the ability of compounds to prevent the formation of DCF by 2,2'-Azobis(2-amidinopropane) dihydrochloride (ABAP)-generated peroxyl radicals in human hepatocarcinoma HepG2 cells. By itself, dichlorofluorescin (DCFH) also quantifies intracellular hydrogen peroxide as well as cellular oxidative stress.
