= Silver chromate =

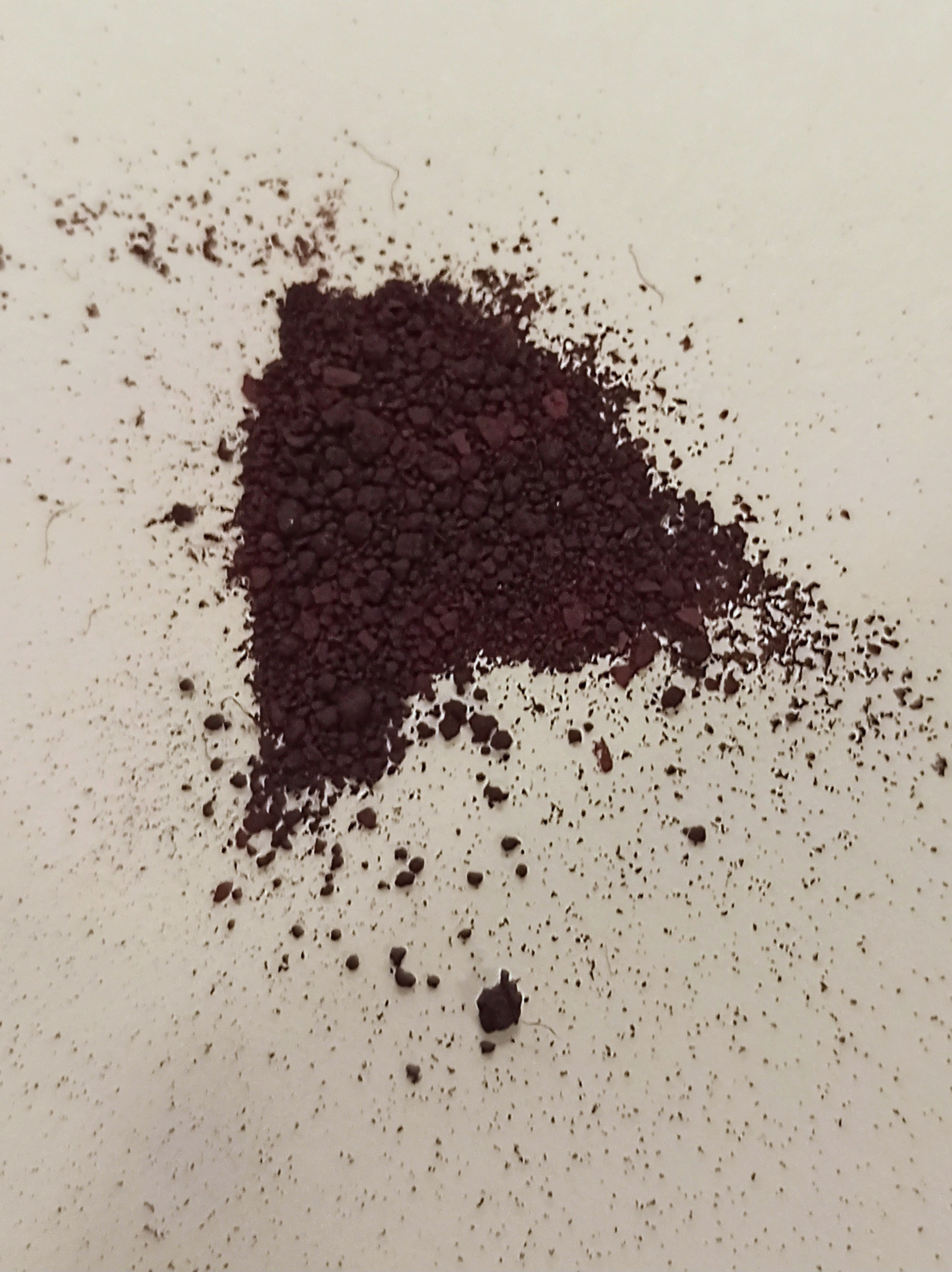

Names
- IUPAC name Silver chromate
- Other names Silver chromate(VI); Silver(I) chromate

Identifiers
CAS Number	7784-01-2
3D model (JSmol)	Interactive image
ChemSpider	56417
ECHA InfoCard	100.029.130
EC Number	232-043-8
PubChem CID	62666
UNII	ZJ5092LWU9
- InChI: InChI=1S/2Ag.Cr.4O/q2*+1;;;;2*-1 Key: OJKANDGLELGDHV-UHFFFAOYSA-N; InChI=1/2Ag.Cr.4O/q2*+1;;;;2*-1/r2Ag.CrO4/c;;2-1(3,4)5/q2*+1;-2 Key: OJKANDGLELGDHV-SCAQNZDMAQ; InChI=1S/2Ag.Cr.4O/q2*+1;;;;2*-1 Key: OJKANDGLELGDHV-UHFFFAOYSA-N
- SMILES: [Ag+].[Ag+].[O-][Cr]([O-])(=O)=O

Properties
Chemical formula	Ag_{2}CrO_{4}
Molar mass	331.73 g/mol
Appearance	brick-red powder
Density	5.625 g/cm^{3}
Melting point	665 °C (1,229 °F; 938 K)
Boiling point	1,550 °C (2,820 °F; 1,820 K)
Solubility in water	0.14 mg/L (0 °C)
Solubility product (K_{sp})	1.12×10^{−12}
Solubility	soluble in nitric acid, ammonia, alkali cyanides and chromates
UV-vis (λ_{max})	450 nm (22200 cm^{−1})
Magnetic susceptibility (χ)	−40.0·10^{−6} cm^{3}/mol
Refractive index (n_{D})	2.2 (630 nm)

Structure
Crystal structure	orthorhombic (T<482 °C) hexagonal (T>482 °C)
Space group	Pnma, № 62 (low T form)
Lattice constant	a = 10.063 Å, b = 7.029 Å, c = 5.540 Å
Formula units (Z)	4

Thermochemistry
Heat capacity (C)	142.3 J·mol^{−1}·K^{−1}
Std molar entropy (S^{⦵}_{298})	217.6 J·mol^{−1}·K^{−1}
Std enthalpy of formation (Δ_{f}H^{⦵}_{298})	−731.7 kJ·mol^{−1}
Gibbs free energy (Δ_{f}G^{⦵})	−641.8 kJ·mol^{−1}

Hazards
- Occupational safety and health (OHS/OSH)
Main hazards	carcinogenic, oxidiser, environmental hazard
- GHS labelling
Pictograms	(GHS03: Oxidizing) (GHS07: Exclamation mark) (GHS08: Health hazard) (GHS09: Environmental hazard)
Signal word	Danger
Hazard statements	H272, H317, H350, H410
Precautionary statements	P202, P210, P273, P280, P302+P352, P308+P313

Related compounds
Other anions	Silver nitrate Silver chloride Silver thiocyanate
Other cations	Potassium chromate Ammonium chromate Lead(II) chromate
- Except where otherwise noted, data are given for materials in their standard state (at 25 °C [77 °F], 100 kPa). verify (what is ?) Infobox references

Silver chromate is an inorganic compound with formula Ag_{2}CrO_{4} which appears as distinctively coloured brown-red crystals. The compound is insoluble and its precipitation is indicative of the reaction between soluble chromate and silver precursor salts (commonly potassium/sodium chromate with silver nitrate). This reaction is important for two uses in the laboratory: in analytical chemistry it constitutes the basis for the Mohr method of argentometry, whereas in neuroscience it is used in the Golgi method of staining neurons for microscopy.

In addition to the above, the compound has been tested as a photocatalyst for wastewater treatment. The most important practical and commercial application for silver chromate, however, is its use in Li-Ag_{2}CrO_{4} batteries, a type of lithium battery mainly found in artificial pacemaker devices.

As for all chromates, which are chromium(VI) species, the compound poses a hazard of toxicity, carcinogenicity and genotoxicity, as well as great environmental harm.

== Preparation ==
Silver chromate is usually produced by the salt metathesis reaction of potassium chromate (K_{2}CrO_{4}) and silver nitrate (AgNO_{3}) in purified water – the silver chromate will precipitate out of the aqueous reaction mixture:

2 AgNO_{3(aq)} + K_{2}CrO_{4(aq)} → 2 KNO_{3(aq)} + Ag_{2}CrO_{4(s)}

This occurs as the solubility of silver chromate is very low (K_{sp} = 1.12×10^{−12} or 6.5×10^{−5} mol/L).

The formation of insoluble Ag_{2}CrO_{4} nanostructures via the above reaction with good control over particle size and shape has been achieved through sonochemistry, template-assisted synthesis or hydrothermal methods.

== Structure and properties ==
=== Crystal structure ===
The compound is polymorphic and can exhibit two crystal structures depending on temperature: hexagonal at higher and orthorhombic at lower temperatures. The hexagonal phase transforms to the orthorhombic upon cooling below the crystal structure transition temperature T=482 °C.

The orthorhombic polymorph is the commonly encountered one and it crystallizes in the space group Pnma, with two distinct coordination environments for the silver ions (one tetragonal bipyramidal and the other distorted tetrahedral).

=== Colour ===
The characteristic brick-red/acajou colour (absorption λ_{max}=450 nm) of silver chromate is rather unlike other chromates which are typically yellow to yellowish orange in appearance. This difference in absorption has been hypothesised to be due to the charge-transfer transition between the silver 4d orbital and chromate e* orbitals, although this seems not to be the case based on careful analysis of UV/Vis spectroscopic data. Instead, the shift in λ_{max} is more likely attributed to the Davydov splitting effect.

== Applications ==
=== Argentometry ===
The precipitation of the strongly coloured silver chromate is used to indicate the endpoint in the titration of chloride with silver nitrate in the Mohr method of argentometry.

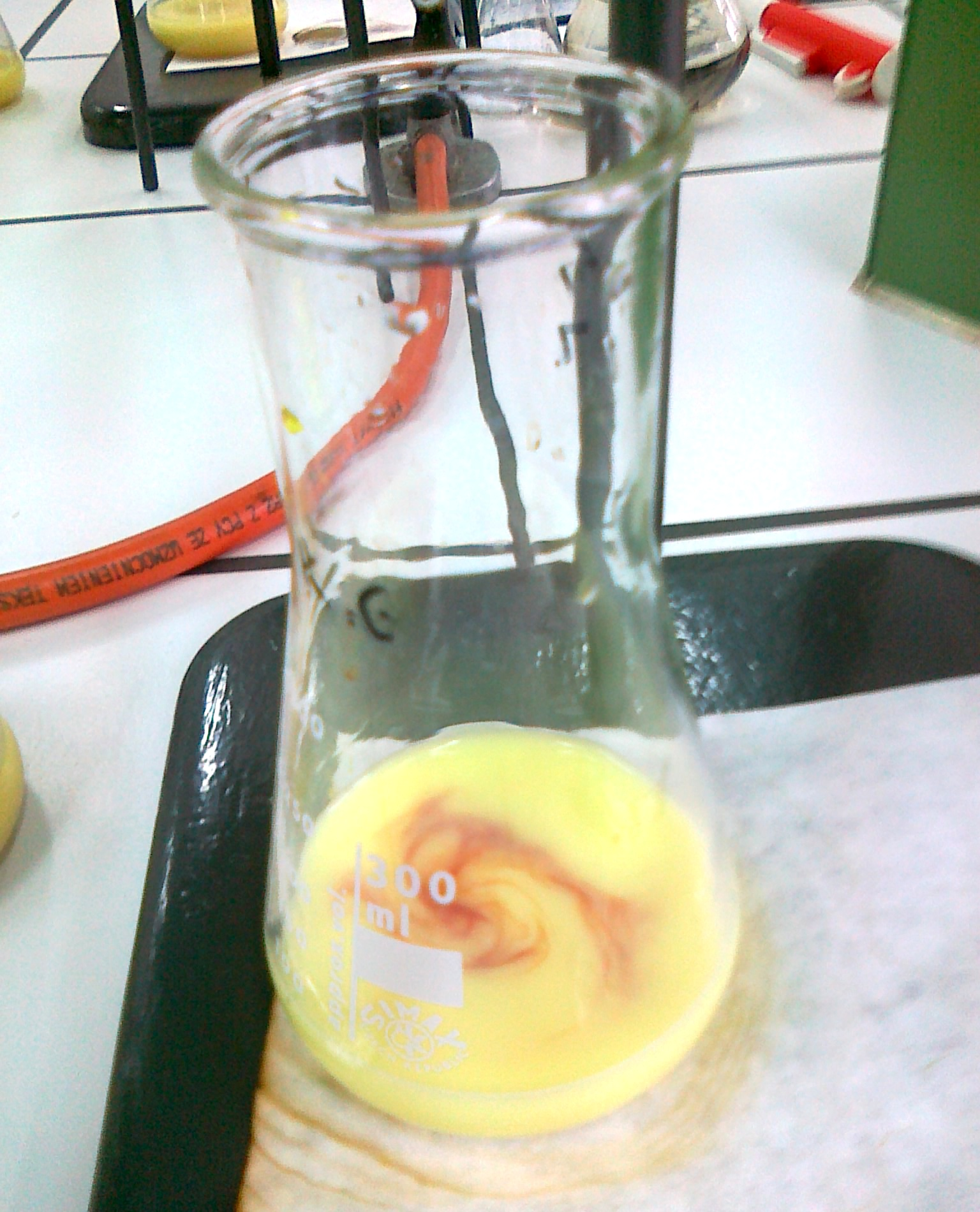
Example of Mohr argentometric titration near the endpoint: note the characteristic brick-red colour appearing due to silver chromate formation.

The reactivity of the chromate anion with silver is lower than with halides (e.g. chlorides) so that in a mixture of both ions, only silver chloride precipitate will form:

AgNO_{3(aq)} + Cl^{−}_{(aq)} + CrO^{2−}_{4(aq)} → AgCl_{(s)} + CrO^{2−}_{4(aq)} + NO^{−}_{3(aq)}

Only when no chloride (or any halogen) is left will silver chromate form and precipitate out.

Prior to the endpoint the solution has a milky lemon-yellow appearance, due to the suspension of the AgCl precipitate already formed and the yellow colour of the chromate ion in solution. Approaching the endpoint, additions of AgNO_{3} lead to steadily more slowly disappearing red colouration. When the red-brownish colour persists (with some greyish spots of silver chloride in it) the endpoint of titration is reached.

This method is only suitable for near neutral pH: in very low (acidic) pH, the silver chromate is soluble (due to the formation of H_{2}CrO_{4}), and in alkaline pH, the silver precipitates as the hydroxide.

The titration was introduced by Mohr in the mid 19th century and despite limitations in pH conditions it has not completely fallen out of use since. An example of a practical application of Mohr's method is in determining the chloride level of salt water pools.

Golgi staining

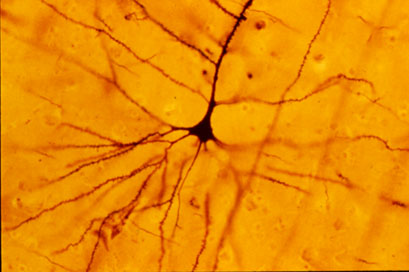
A human pyramidal neuron stained using Golgi technique (true colour)

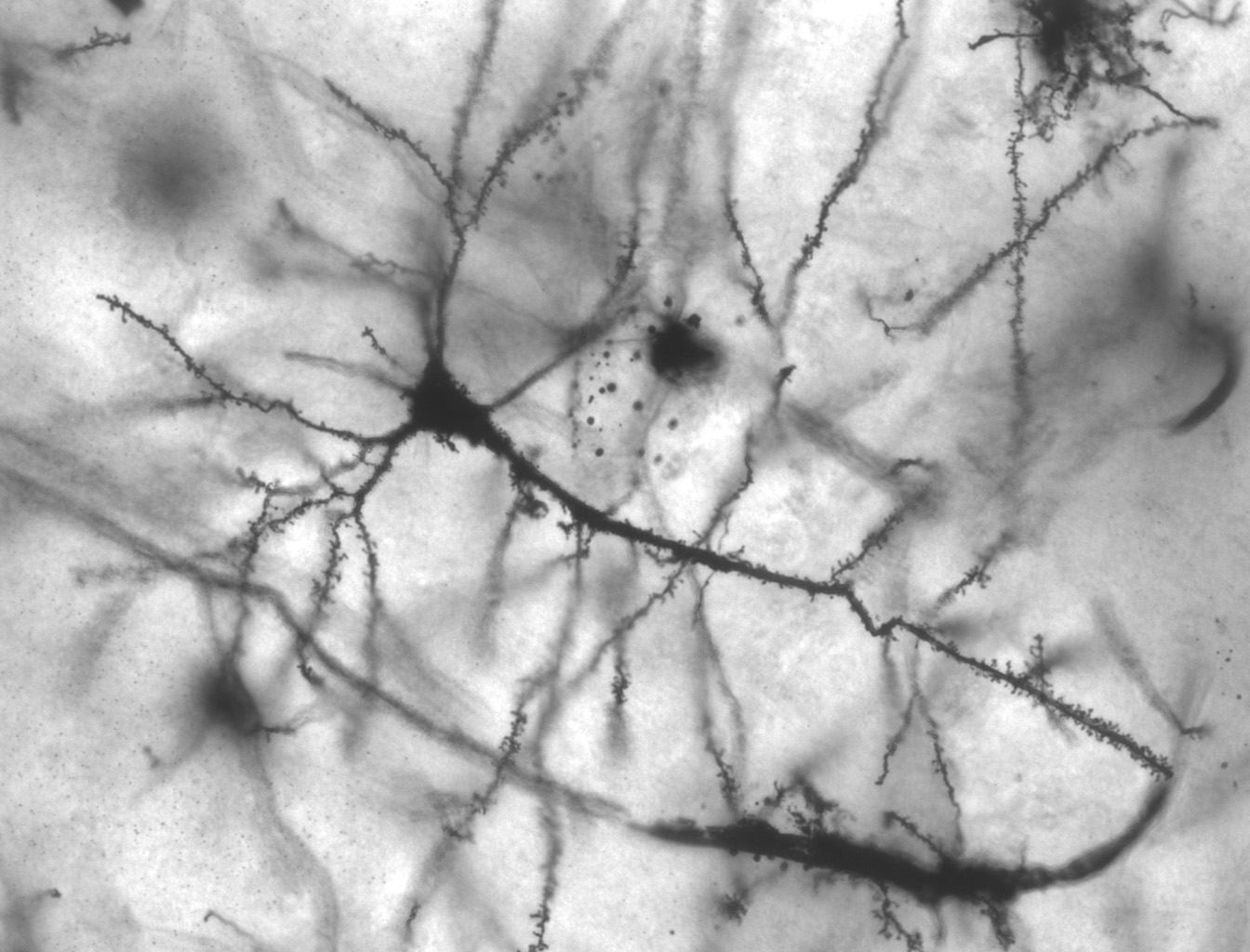
A different pyramidal neuron stained with Golgi's method (B&W with enhanced contrast)

=== Golgi method ===
A very different application of the same reaction is for the staining of neurons so that their morphology becomes visible under a microscope. The technique involves first impregnating aldehyde-fixed brain tissue with a 2% aqueous potassium dichromate solution. This is followed by drying and immersion in a 2% aqueous silver nitrate solution.

By the same reaction as above, silver chromate forms and by a mechanism not entirely understood the precipitation occurs inside some of the neurons, allowing detailed observation of morphological details too fine for common staining techniques.

Several variations on the method exist to increase contrast or selectivity in the type of neuron stained, and include additional impregnation in mercuric chloride solution (Golgi-Cox) or post-treatment with osmium tetroxide (Cajal or rapid Golgi).

The previously infeasible observations enabled by the silver chromate staining technique led to the eventual award of the 1906 Nobel Prize in Physiology or Medicine to discoverer Golgi and pioneer of its use and improvement Ramón y Cajal.

=== Photocatalyst ===
Silver chromate has been investigated for possible use as a catalyst for the photocatalytic degradation of organic pollutants in wastewater. Although Ag_{2}CrO_{4} nanoparticles are somehow effective for this purpose, the high toxicity of chromium(VI) to humans and the environment requires additional complex procedures for the containment of any chromium from the catalyst, which must be prevented from leaching into the treated wastewater.

=== Li-batteries ===
Li-Ag_{2}CrO_{4} batteries are a type of Li-metal batteries developed in the early 1970s by Saft, in which silver chromate serves as the cathode, metallic lithium as the anode, and a lithium perchlorate solution as the electrolyte.

The battery was intended for biomedical applications and had characteristics like high reliability and shelf life quality for the time of discovery. Lithium-silver chromate batteries have therefore found wide application in implanted pacemaker devices.

== Cited sources ==
- Haynes, William M., ed. (2016). CRC Handbook of Chemistry and Physics (97th ed.). CRC Press. ISBN 9781498754293.
