= Dattatraya Balkrishna Limaye =

Indian chemist (1887–1971)

- Born: 31 July 1887; Manache, Ratnagiri district
- Died: 26 February 1971 (aged 83); Pune, Maharashtra
- Education: Fergusson College
- Known for: Karanjin formula, Nidhone process
- Awards: Balasaheb Mirajkar prize, Honorary D.Sc.
- Scientific career
- Fields: Organic chemistry
- Workplaces: Ranade Industrial and Economic Institute

Dattatraya Balkrishna Limaye (13 July 1887 – 26 February 1971) was an Indian chemist known for his contributions to the study of plant-based chemical compounds such as Karanjin and the development of the "Nidhone process." He served as a researcher and administrator at the Ranade Institute in Pune.

== Early life and education ==
Dattatraya Balkrishna Limaye was born on 31 July 1887 into a Chitpavan Brahmin family in Manache, Devgad taluka, Ratnagiri district. He completed his primary and secondary schooling in Havnur, Nashik, and at the Prabhu Seminary in Mumbai, passing his matriculation in 1905 with high distinction.

After a brief period at Elphinstone College, he moved to Fergusson College in Pune in 1907. While still a student in 1908, he established the Balakrishna Rasashala to manufacture chemicals. He earned his B.A. in physics (1909), B.Sc. (1910), and M.A. in chemistry (1911) from Bombay University. He was awarded the Balasaheb Mirajkar prize for achieving the highest marks in his university examinations.

In 1907, he moved to Pune to study at Fergusson College. While still a student in 1908, influenced by T. K. Gajjar, he established the Balakrishna Rasashala to manufacture chemicals. He earned his B.A. with a focus on Physics in 1909, a B.Sc. in 1910, and an M.A. in chemistry in 1911. He was awarded the Balasaheb Mirajkar prize for achieving the highest marks at the Bombay University. , Limaye refused several prestigious government job offers, including lecturerships at Elphinstone College and the Royal Institute of Science, to maintain his political independence.

== Career ==
In 1912, Limaye was appointed as a research chemist at the Ranade Industrial and Economic Institute with a monthly salary of ₹60 (equivalent to ₹19,000 or US$190 in 2023). He worked under the guidance of Harold Hart Mann, conducting research on industrial applications of chemistry, such as using Tarvad bark for tanning hides; this process was later utilized by the British government during World War I. He also assisted local artisans in Pune and Varanasi with metalwork (Jari), mirror manufacturing, and soap processing.

Limaye was then promoted and became the Director at the Ranade Institute, serving until 1940. During his tenure, he often clashed with the institute's administration over his preference for fundamental research over purely applied science. In 1925, he built a private residence and laboratory named "Kapilashram" in Pune, where he dedicated a portion of his personal income to chemical research.

== Scientific contributions ==
=== Karanjin and Nidhone process ===
Limaye's most notable achievement was determining the chemical formula for Karanjin (C_{18}H_{12}O_{4}), a crystalline compound he isolated in the oil of the Karanj tree (Pongamia glabra). He successfully mapped its structure as three fused rings, which Nobel laureate Paul Karrer had been unable to do before. To facilitate the synthesis of such compounds, he invented a new chemical method which he named the "Nidhone process". The name was derived from "Nidhi" (referring to his research fund, Rasayananidhi) and "one" (indicating the Ketone group). This process gained international recognition and was adopted by researchers in the United Kingdom, the Soviet Union, and Japan to develop new chemical compounds.

=== Publications and academic roles ===
In 1930, Limaye was recognized as an M.Sc. and Ph.D. guide by Bombay University. To provide a platform for his students' research, he launched the English-language journal Rasayanam in 1936. The journal was edited by D. D. Karve and V. K. Bhagwat and remained in publication until 1956. His work was also featured in international and domestic academic publications, including the Journal of the Indian Chemical Society and the German Chemical Society's journal, Berichte.

== Philosophy and personal life ==
Limaye was known for his commitment to rationalism and the dignity of labour. He named his home after Kapila, the exponent of Samkhya philosophy, and avoided traditional religious festivals in favour of scientific inquiry. He frequently performed manual tasks himself, including mending shoes and cleaning his laboratory, to set an example for his students. A frugal scientist, Limaye often invented his own laboratory equipment to save costs, such as a charcoal-based combustion furnace to replace more expensive imported models. He emphasized the importance of using indigenous Indian natural resources and predicted a future energy crisis as early as the 1960s. C. V. Raman, with whom Limaye shared a close friendship, appreciated Limaye for his selfless intellectual pursuits. Limaye was also a follower of Bal Gangadhar Tilak.

== Legacy and awards ==
Limaye established the "Rasayananidhi" trust in 1930 to fund chemical research in Western India. In 1949, he founded "Rasayan Mandir," a dedicated laboratory for theoretical and applied chemistry. Although the laboratory was dissolved in 1962 due to a lack of government grants, its assets were donated to the University of Poona to establish a doctoral fellowship in his memory.

In 1967, on his 80th birthday, the University of Poona awarded him an honorary D.Sc. (Doctor of Science) in recognition of his lifetime of research and mentorship of 40 M.Sc. and 2 Ph.D. students. Limaye died in Pune on 26 February 1971 following a kidney ailment.
