= Argentometry =

Titration involving the silver ion

In analytical chemistry, argentometry is a type of titration involving the silver(I) ion. Typically, it is used to determine the amount of chloride present in a sample. The sample solution is titrated against a solution of silver nitrate of known concentration. Chloride ions react with silver(I) ions to give the insoluble silver chloride:

Ag^{+}(aq) + Cl^{−}(aq) → AgCl(s) (K = 5.88 × 10^{−9} mol^{-2} dm^{6})

== Methods ==
=== Volhard ===
An example of back titration, the Volhard method, named after Jacob Volhard, involves the addition of excess silver nitrate to the analyte; the silver chloride is filtered, and the remaining silver nitrate is titrated against ammonium thiocyanate, with ferric ammonium sulfate as an indicator which forms blood-red [Fe(H_{2}O)_{5}SCN]^{2+} at the end point:

Ag^{+}(aq) + SCN^{−}(aq) → AgSCN(s) (K_{sp} = 1.16 × 10^{-12} mol^{-2} dm^{6})
[Fe(OH)(H_{2}O)_{5}]^{2+}(aq) + SCN^{−}(aq)→ [Fe(H_{2}O)_{5}SCN]^{2+}(aq) + OH^{−}(aq)

=== Mohr ===
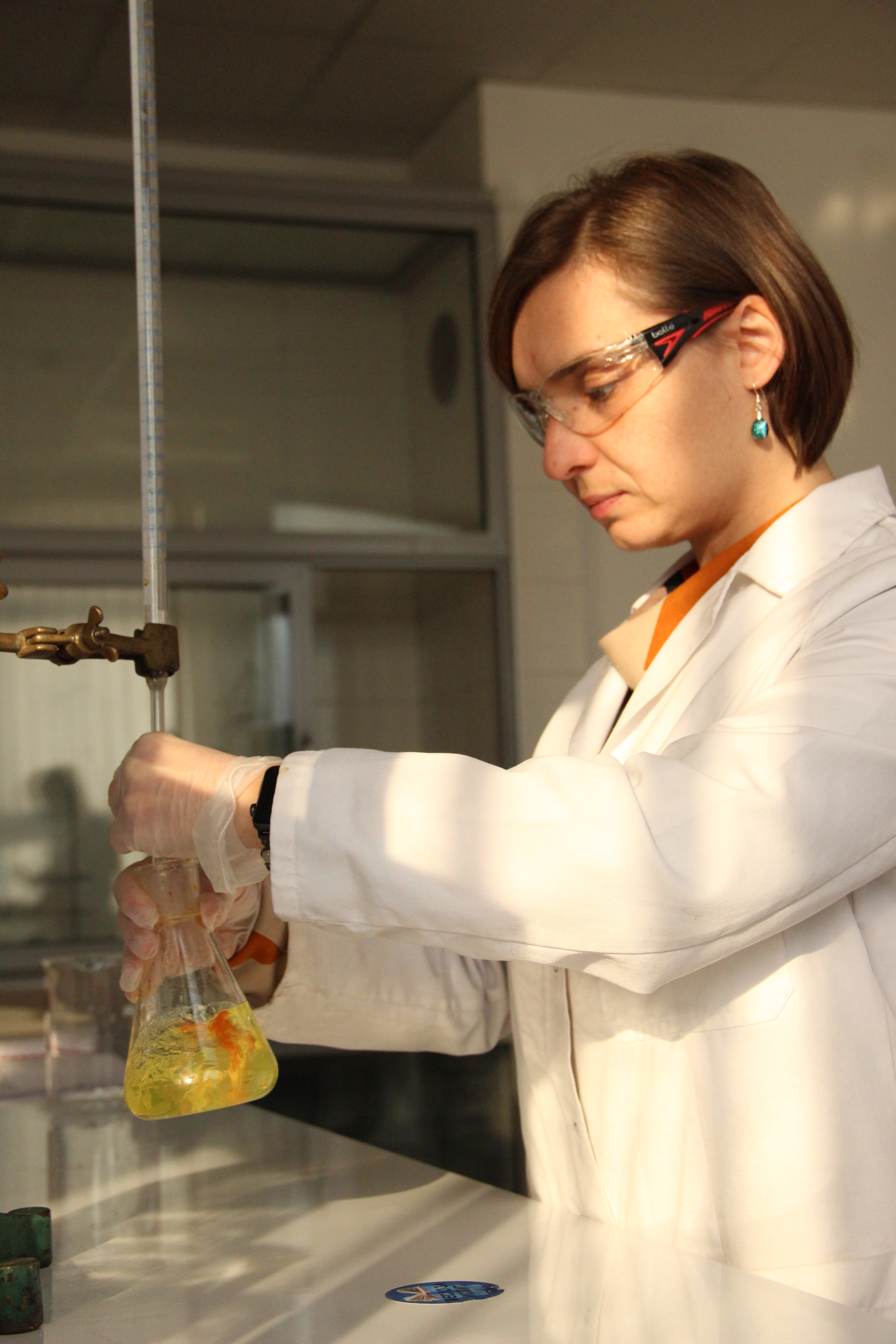
Determining chlorides in water by the Mohr method. Potassium chromate is added as indicator in an Erlenmeyer flask and the end of the reaction is determined by the slight red color given by the silver chromate.

In the Mohr method, named after Karl Friedrich Mohr, potassium chromate is an indicator, giving red silver chromate after all chloride ions have reacted:

2 Ag^{+}(aq) + CrO_{4}^{2−}(aq) → Ag_{2}CrO_{4}(s) (K_{sp} = 1.1 × 10^{-12} mol^{-3} dm^{9})

The solution needs to be near neutral, because silver hydroxide forms at high pH, while the chromate forms Ag_{2}Cr_{2}O_{7} or AgHCrO_{4} at low pH, reducing the concentration of chromate ions, and delaying the formation of the precipitate. Carbonates and phosphates precipitate with silver, and need to be absent to prevent inaccurate results.

The Mohr method may be adapted to determine the total chlorine content of a sample by igniting the sample with calcium, then ferric acetate. Calcium acetate "fixes" free chlorine, precipitates carbonates, and neutralizes the resultant solution. Ferric acetate removes phosphates. All chlorides are dissolved out of the residue, and titrated.

=== Fajans ===
In the Fajans method, named after Kazimierz Fajans, typically dichlorofluorescein or another absorption dye is used as an indicator; the end-point is marked by the green suspension turning pink. Prior to the end-point of the titration, chloride ions remain in excess. They adsorb on the AgCl surface, imparting a negative charge to the particles. Past the equivalence point, excess silver(I) ions adsorb on the AgCl surface, imparting a positive charge. Anionic dyes such as dichlorofluorescein are attracted to the particles, and undergo a colour change upon adsorption, representing the end-point. Eosin (tetrabromofluorescein) is suitable for titrating against bromide, iodide, and thiocyanate anions, giving a sharper end-point than dichlorofluorescein. It is not suitable for titrating against chloride anions because it binds to AgCl more strongly than chloride does.

== See also ==
- Silver halide
- Titration
