= Karanjin =

- Chemical structure of karanjin

Names
- IUPAC name 3-Methoxyfuro[2′′,3′′:7,8]flavone
- Systematic IUPAC name 3-Methoxy-2-phenyl-4H-furo[2,3-h][1]benzopyran-4-one

Identifiers
CAS Number	521-88-0
3D model (JSmol)	Interactive image; Interactive image
ChEMBL	ChEMBL208484
ChemSpider	90925
ECHA InfoCard	100.007.565
PubChem CID	100633
UNII	WV7IM0I02M
CompTox Dashboard (EPA)	DTXSID20200106
- InChI: InChI=1S/C18H12O4/c1-20-18-15(19)13-7-8-14-12(9-10-21-14)17(13)22-16(18)11-5-3-2-4-6-11/h2-10H,1H3 Key: LKPQNZRGGNOPPU-UHFFFAOYSA-N
- SMILES: C1(=C(OC2=C(C1=O)C=CC3=C2C=CO3)C4=CC=CC=C4)OC; O=C2C(\OC)=C(/Oc3c1ccoc1ccc23)c4ccccc4

Properties
Chemical formula	C_{18}H_{12}O_{4}
Molar mass	292.290 g·mol^{−1}
- Except where otherwise noted, data are given for materials in their standard state (at 25 °C [77 °F], 100 kPa). verify (what is ?) Infobox references

Karanjin is a furanoflavonol, a type of flavonoid. It is obtained from the seeds of the karanja tree (Millettia pinnata or Pongamia glabra Vent.), a tree growing wild in south India. Karanjin is an acaricide and insecticide. Karanjin is reported to have nitrification inhibitory properties. Its formula was discovered by D. B. Limaye.
