= Trolox equivalent antioxidant capacity =

Antioxidant capacity of a given substance

The Trolox equivalent antioxidant capacity (TEAC) assay measures the antioxidant capacity of a given substance, as compared to the standard, Trolox. Most commonly, antioxidant capacity is measured using the ABTS Decolorization Assay. Other antioxidant capacity assays which use Trolox as a standard include the diphenylpicrylhydrazyl (DPPH), oxygen radical absorbance capacity (ORAC) and ferric reducing ability of plasma (FRAP) assays. The TEAC assay is often used to measure the antioxidant capacity of foods, beverages and nutritional supplements.
