= Metal-phenolic network =

Universally adherent nanocoatings

A metal-phenolic network (MPN) is a supramolecular coordination compound that is derived from metal ions and polyphenols that can be deposited onto nearly any surface. MPNs adsorb to a wide variety of surfaces due to noncovalent forces. Possible applications of MPN-based materials include drug delivery, bioimaging, biotechnology, and electrocatalysis.
