= Oxygen radical absorbance capacity =

Obsolete method of characterizing antioxidants in vitro

Oxygen radical absorbance capacity (ORAC) was a method of measuring antioxidant capacities in biological samples in vitro. Because no physiological proof in vivo existed in support of the free-radical theory or that ORAC provided information relevant to biological antioxidant potential, it was withdrawn in 2012.

Various foods were tested using this method, with certain spices, berries and legumes rated highly in extensive tables once published by the United States Department of Agriculture (USDA). Alternative measurements include the Folin-Ciocalteu reagent, and the Trolox equivalent antioxidant capacity assay.

== Method ==
The assay measures the oxidative degradation of the fluorescent molecule (either beta-phycoerythrin or fluorescein) after being mixed with free radical generators such as azo-initiator compounds. Azo-initiators are considered to produce the peroxyl radical by heating, which damages the fluorescent molecule, resulting in the loss of fluorescence. Antioxidants are considered to protect the fluorescent molecule from the oxidative degeneration. The degree of protection is quantified using a fluorometer. Fluorescein is currently used most as a fluorescent probe. Equipment that can automatically measure and calculate the capacity is commercially available (Biotek, Roche Diagnostics).

The fluorescent intensity decreases as the oxidative degeneration proceeds, and this intensity is typically recorded for 35 minutes after the addition of the azo-initiator (free radical generator). So far, AAPH (2,2’-azobis(2-amidino-propane) dihydrochloride) is the sole free-radical generator used. The degeneration (or decomposition) of fluorescein is measured as the presence of the antioxidant slows the fluorescence decay. Decay curves (fluorescence intensity vs. time) are recorded and the area between the two decay curves (with or without antioxidant) is calculated. Subsequently, the degree of antioxidant-mediated protection is quantified using the antioxidant trolox (a vitamin E analogue) as a standard. Different concentrations of trolox are used to make a standard curve, and test samples are compared to this. Results for test samples (foods) have been published as "trolox equivalents" or TEs.

A possible benefit of using the ORAC method to evaluate substances' antioxidant capacities is that it takes into account samples with and without lag phases of their antioxidant capacities.

Drawbacks of this method are: 1) only antioxidant activity against particular (probably mainly peroxyl) radicals is measured; however, peroxyl radical formation has never been proven; 2) the nature of the damaging reaction is not characterized; 3) there is no evidence that free radicals are involved in this reaction; and 4) there is no evidence that ORAC values have any biological significance following consumption of any food. Moreover, the relationship between ORAC values and a health benefit has not been established.

Resulting from scientific refutation of the physiological significance of ORAC, the USDA, which had been collating and publishing ORAC data for more than a decade, withdrew its web publication of ORAC values for common American foods in May 2012.

Several modified ORAC methods have been proposed. Most of them employ the same principle (i.e. measurement of AAPH-radical mediated damage of fluorescein); however, ORAC-EPR, electron paramagnetic resonance-based ORAC method directly measures the decrease of AAPH-radical level by the scavenging action of the antioxidant substance.

== Regulatory guidance ==
In the following discussion, the term "antioxidant" refers mainly to non-nutrient compounds in foods, such as polyphenols, which have antioxidant capacity in vitro, so provide an artificial index of antioxidant strength—the ORAC measurement.

Other than for dietary antioxidant vitamins—vitamin A, vitamin C and vitamin E—no food compounds have been proved with antioxidant efficacy in vivo. Accordingly, regulatory agencies such as the Food and Drug Administration of the United States and the European Food Safety Authority (EFSA) have published guidance forbidding food product labels to claim or imply an antioxidant benefit when no such physiological evidence exists. This guidance for the United States and European Union establishes it is illegal to imply potential health benefits on package labels of products with high ORAC.

== Physiological context ==
Although research in vitro indicates polyphenols are good antioxidants and probably influence the ORAC value, antioxidant effects in vivo are probably negligible or absent. By non-antioxidant mechanisms still undefined, flavonoids and other polyphenols may reduce the risk of cardiovascular disease and cancer.

As interpreted by the Linus Pauling Institute, EFSA and the USDA, dietary polyphenols have little or no direct antioxidant food value following digestion. Not like controlled test tube conditions, the fate of polyphenols in vivo shows they are poorly conserved (less than 5%), with most of what is absorbed existing as chemically modified metabolites destined for rapid excretion.

The increase in antioxidant capacity of blood seen after the consumption of polyphenol-rich (ORAC-rich) foods is not caused directly by the polyphenols, but most likely results from increased uric acid levels derived from metabolism of flavonoids. According to Frei, "we can now follow the activity of flavonoids in the body, and one thing that is clear is that the body sees them as foreign compounds and is trying to get rid of them."

== Food sources ==
Values are expressed as the sum of the lipid soluble (e.g. carotenoid) and water-soluble (e.g. phenolic) antioxidant fractions (i.e., “total ORAC”) reported as in micromoles trolox equivalents (TE) per 100 gram sample, and are compared to assessments of total polyphenol content in the samples.

These values are considered biologically irrelevant by the EFSA and USDA.

Food ORAC scores - USDA
Food	Serving size	ORAC, Trolox equiv., μmol per 100 g
Prune	1 cup (~240 mL)	14,582
Small Red Bean	1/2 cup (~120 mL) dried beans	13,727
Wild blueberry	1 cup (~240 mL)	13,427
Red kidney bean	1/2 cup (~120 mL) dried beans	13,259
Pinto bean	1/2 cup (~120 mL)	11,864
Cranberry	1 cup (~240 mL) raw (whole berries)	9,584
Blueberry	1 cup (~240 mL) raw (cultivated berries)	9,019
Artichoke hearts	1 cup (~240 mL), cooked	7,904
Raw unprocessed Cocoa bean	1 oz (28 g)	7,840
Blackberry	1 cup (~240 mL) raw (cultivated berries)	7,701
Raspberry	1 cup (~240 mL)	6,058
Strawberry	1 cup (~240 mL)	5,938
Red Delicious apple	1 apple	5,900
Granny Smith apple	1 apple	5,381
Pecan	1 oz (28 g)	5,095
Sweet cherry	1 cup (~240 mL)	4,873
Black plum	1 plum	4,844
Russet potato	1, cooked	4,649
Chokeberry	1 oz (28 g)	4,497
Black bean	1/2 cup (~120 mL) dried beans	4,181
Plum	1 plum	4,118
Gala apple	1 apple	3,903
Pomegranate	100 grams	2,860

With nearly all vegetables, conventional boiling can reduce the ORAC value by up to 90%, while steaming retains more of the antioxidants.

== Comparisons of ORAC values ==
The United States Department of Agriculture, previously a publisher of ORAC data, withdrew its web publication of ORAC values for common American foods in 2012 owing to absence of scientific evidence that ORAC has any biological significance.

When comparing ORAC data, care must be taken to ensure the units and food being compared are similar. Some evaluations will compare ORAC units per gram of dry weight of the intact food or its milled powder, others will evaluate ORAC units in fresh or frozen wet weight, and still others will look at ORAC units per serving. Under each evaluation, different foods can appear to have higher ORAC values. For example, although a raisin has no more antioxidant potential than the grape from which it was dried, raisins will appear to have a higher ORAC value per gram of wet weight than grapes due to their reduced water content. Likewise, the large water content in watermelon can make it appear as though this fruit is low in ORAC. Similarly, the typical quantity of food used should be considered; herbs and spices may be high in ORAC, but are applied in much smaller quantities compared to intact whole foods.

Numerous health food and beverage companies and marketers have erroneously capitalized on the ORAC rating by promoting products claimed to be "high in ORAC". As most of these ORAC values have not been independently validated or subjected to peer review for publication in scientific literature, they remain unconfirmed, are not scientifically credible, and may mislead consumers.

== See also ==
- List of antioxidants in food
- Polyphenol antioxidants
- Reduction potential
- Trolox (TEAC)
