= C-methylated flavonoid =

Flavonoids having a methyl group attached to a flavan core structure

C-methylated flavonoids are a category of flavonoid having methylation(s) on carbon. An example of such compounds is the flavanone poriol.

== See also ==
- O-methylated flavonoid
