= Furanoflavonoid =

Karanjin, a furanoflavonol

Furanoflavonoids are flavonoids possessing a furan group.

An example of a furanoflavonoid is karanjin.
