= Bilirubin oxidase =

Class of enzymes

bilirubin oxidase
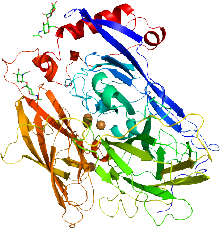
- Cartoon representation of the X-ray structure of bilirubin oxidase from Myrothecium verrucaria based on PDB accession code PDB: 2xll. The protein ribbon is rainbow colored with the N-terminus in blue and the C-terminus in red. The four copper atoms are shown as spheres and the glycans shown as sticks.

Identifiers
- EC no.: 1.3.3.5
- CAS no.: 80619-01-8

Databases
- BRENDA: enzyme data
- ExPASy: NiceZyme view
- KEGG: enzyme entry
- MetaCyc: metabolic pathway
- Rhea: reactions
- PDB structures: RCSB PDB PDBe PDBsum
- Gene Ontology: AmiGO / QuickGO
Search
- PMC: articles
- PubMed: articles
- NCBI: proteins

In enzymology, bilirubin oxidase, BOD or BOx, (EC 1.3.3.5) is an enzyme encoded by a gene in various organisms that catalyzes the chemical reaction:

2
bilirubin
O_{2}
2 H_{2}O
2
biliverdin

This enzyme belongs to the family of oxidoreductases, to be specific those acting on the CH-CH group of donor with oxygen as acceptor. The systematic name of this enzyme class is bilirubin:oxygen oxidoreductase. This enzyme is also called bilirubin oxidase M-1. It is widely studied as a catalyst for oxygen reduction to water in biofuel cell applications.

Two structures of bilirubin oxidase from the ascomycete Myrothecium verrucaria have been deposited in the Protein Data Bank (accession codes PDB: 3abg and PDB: 2xll).

The active site consists of four copper centers, reminiscent of laccase. These centers are classified as type I (cys, met, his, his), type II (3his), and two type III (2his). The latter two centers are arranged in a trinuclear copper cluster forming the active site for oxygen reduction. The type I copper center is the primary electron acceptor and the site for the reduction of bilirubin.

== See also ==
- Biliverdin reductase which catalyses the reverse reaction (biliverdin to bilirubin) in the catabolism of heme B
