= Poriol =

- Chemical structure of poriol

Names
- IUPAC name (2S)-5,7-Dihydroxy-2-(4-hydroxyphenyl)-6-methyl-2,3-dihydrochromen-4-one
- Other names (2S)-4',5,7-Trihydroxy-6-methylflavanone

Identifiers
CAS Number	14348-16-4
3D model (JSmol)	Interactive image
ChemSpider	57643118
PubChem CID	92258068
- InChI: InChI=1S/C16H14O5/c1-8-11(18)6-14-15(16(8)20)12(19)7-13(21-14)9-2-4-10(17)5-3-9/h2-6,13,17-18,20H,7H2,1H3/t13-/m0/s1 Key: SLFZBNOERHGNMI-ZDUSSCGKSA-N
- SMILES: CC1=C(C2=C(C=C1O)O[C@@H](CC2=O)C3=CC=C(C=C3)O)O

Properties
Chemical formula	C_{16}H_{14}O_{5}
Molar mass	286.283 g·mol^{−1}
- Except where otherwise noted, data are given for materials in their standard state (at 25 °C [77 °F], 100 kPa). verify (what is ?) Infobox references

Poriol is a C-methylated flavanone, a type of flavonoid. It is found in Pseudotsuga menziesii (Douglas fir) in reaction to infection by Poria weirii.
