= Raspberry ellagitannin =

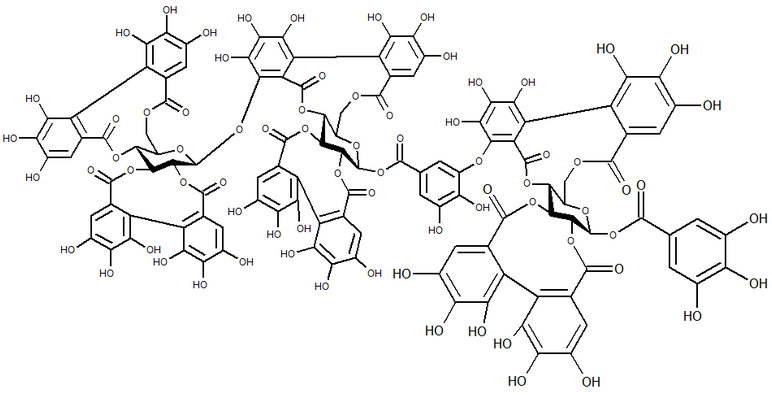
- Chemical structure of raspberry ellagitannin

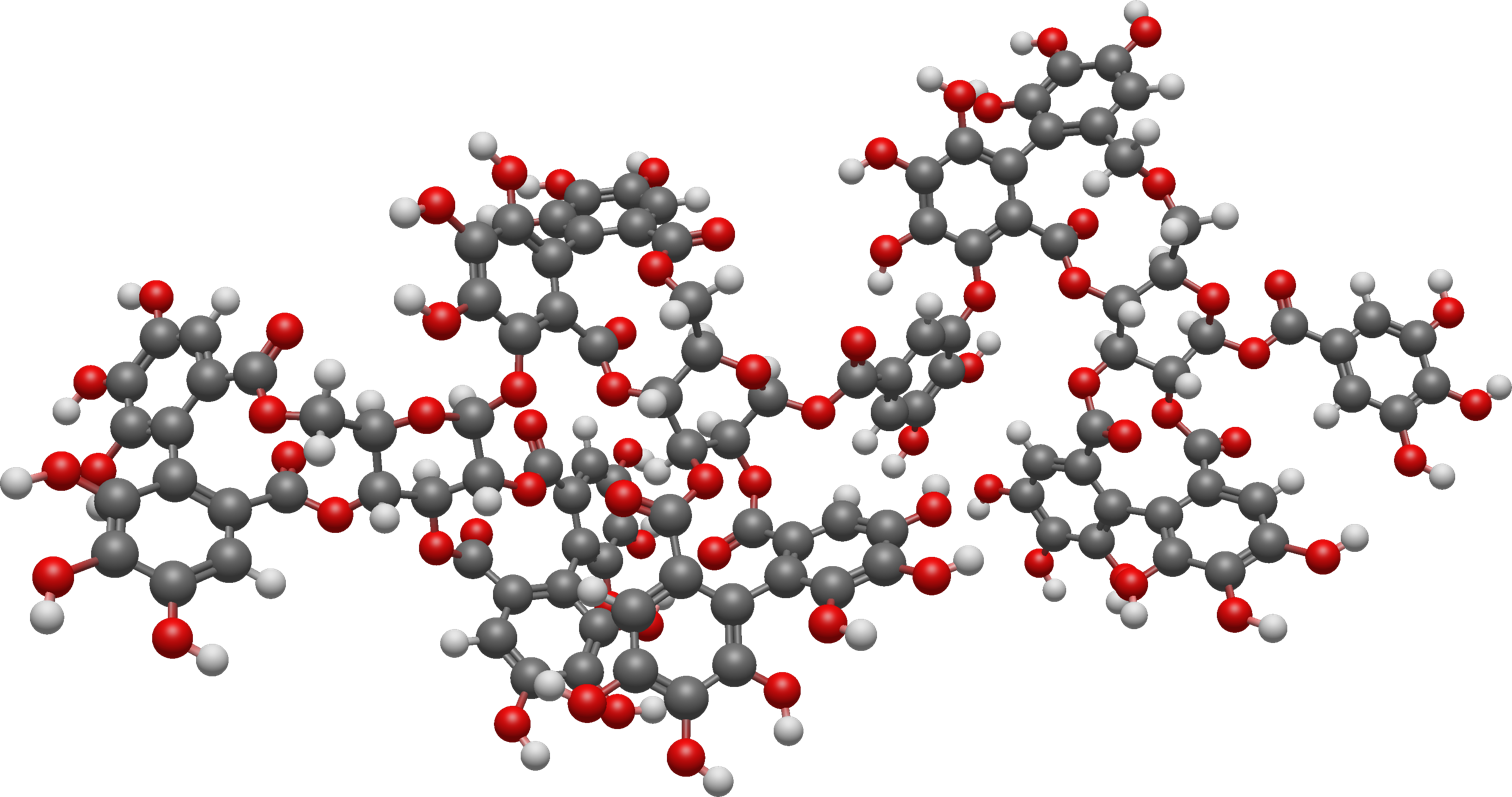
- Chemical structure of raspberry ellagitannin

Names
- IUPAC name (10aR,11S,12aR,25aR,25bS)-23-{[(10aR,11S,12aR,25aR,25bS)-2,3,4,5,6,7,17,18,19,20,21,22-Dodecahydroxy-9,15,24,27-tetraoxo-9,10a,11,12a,13,15,24,25a,25b,27-decahydrodibenzo[g,i]dibenzo[6',7':8',9'][1,4]dioxecino[2',3':4,5]pyrano[3,2-b][1,5]dioxacycloundecin-11-yl]oxy}-2,3,4,5,6,7,17,18,19,20,21,22-dodecahydroxy-9,15,24,27-tetraoxo-9,10a,11,12a,13,15,24,25a,25b,27-decahydrodibenzo[g,i]dibenzo[6',7':8',9'][1,4]dioxecino[2',3':4,5]pyrano[3,2-b][1,5]dioxacycloundecin-11-yl 3-({(10aR,11S,12aR,25aR,25bS)-2,3,4,5,6,7,17,18,19,20,21,22-dodecahydroxy-9,15,24,27-tetraoxo-11-[(3,4,5-trihydroxybenzoyl)oxy]-9,10a,11,12a,13,15,24,25a,25b,27-decahydrodibenzo[g,i]dibenzo[6',7':8',9'][1,4]dioxecino[2',3':4,5]pyrano[3,2-b][1,5]dioxacycloundecin-23-yl}oxy)-4,5-dihydroxybenzoate

Identifiers
3D model (JSmol)	Interactive image
ChemSpider	28190825
PubChem CID	71308261
- InChI: InChI=1S/C116H76O74/c117-30-1-18(2-31(118)61(30)130)100(158)189-115-98-95(183-107(165)25-10-38(125)66(135)76(145)50(25)53-28(110(168)186-98)13-41(128)69(138)79(53)148)90-45(177-115)16-173-103(161)21-6-34(121)71(140)81(150)55(21)57-59(112(170)180-90)92(87(156)85(154)83(57)152)175-43-4-19(3-32(119)62(43)131)101(159)190-116-99-96(184-108(166)26-11-39(126)67(136)77(146)51(26)54-29(111(169)187-99)14-42(129)70(139)80(54)149)91-46(178-116)17-174-104(162)22-7-35(122)72(141)82(151)56(22)58-60(113(171)181-91)93(88(157)86(155)84(58)153)188-114-97-94(182-106(164)24-9-37(124)65(134)75(144)49(24)52-27(109(167)185-97)12-40(127)68(137)78(52)147)89-44(176-114)15-172-102(160)20-5-33(120)63(132)73(142)47(20)48-23(105(163)179-89)8-36(123)64(133)74(48)143/h1-14,44-46,89-91,94-99,114-157H,15-17H2/t44-,45-,46-,89-,90-,91-,94+,95+,96+,97-,98-,99-,114+,115+,116+/m1/s1 Key: SCUOTXCAXJHPJQ-DFBBAVCWSA-N; InChI=1/C116H76O74/c117-30-1-18(2-31(118)61(30)130)100(158)189-115-98-95(183-107(165)25-10-38(125)66(135)76(145)50(25)53-28(110(168)186-98)13-41(128)69(138)79(53)148)90-45(177-115)16-173-103(161)21-6-34(121)71(140)81(150)55(21)57-59(112(170)180-90)92(87(156)85(154)83(57)152)175-43-4-19(3-32(119)62(43)131)101(159)190-116-99-96(184-108(166)26-11-39(126)67(136)77(146)51(26)54-29(111(169)187-99)14-42(129)70(139)80(54)149)91-46(178-116)17-174-104(162)22-7-35(122)72(141)82(151)56(22)58-60(113(171)181-91)93(88(157)86(155)84(58)153)188-114-97-94(182-106(164)24-9-37(124)65(134)75(144)49(24)52-27(109(167)185-97)12-40(127)68(137)78(52)147)89-44(176-114)15-172-102(160)20-5-33(120)63(132)73(142)47(20)48-23(105(163)179-89)8-36(123)64(133)74(48)143/h1-14,44-46,89-91,94-99,114-157H,15-17H2/t44-,45-,46-,89-,90-,91-,94+,95+,96+,97-,98-,99-,114+,115+,116+/m1/s1 Key: SCUOTXCAXJHPJQ-DFBBAVCWBY
- SMILES: Oc7c(O)cc%21c(c7O)-c6c(O)c(O)c(O)cc6C(=O)OCC(C(OC%21=O)C%15OC(=O)c(cc%16O)c-4c(O)c%16O)OC(C%15OC(=O)c(c-4c%23O)cc(O)c%23O)Oc(c1O)c(c(c(O)c1O)-c(c%10O)c%13cc(O)c%10O)C(=O)OC%11C(COC%13=O)OC(C(OC(=O)c(cc(O)c%19O)c(c%19O)-c%12c8O)C%11OC(=O)c%12cc(O)c8O)OC(=O)c(cc%20O)cc(c%20O)Oc(c(O)c(O)c3O)c%18c3-c5c(O)c(O)c(O)cc5C(=O)OCC(OC(OC(=O)c(cc%22O)cc(O)c%22O)C%17OC(=O)c%14cc(O)c2O)C(OC%18=O)C%17OC(=O)c9cc(O)c(O)c(O)c9-c%14c2O

Properties
Chemical formula	C_{116}H_{76}O_{74}
Molar mass	2653.79 g/mol
- Except where otherwise noted, data are given for materials in their standard state (at 25 °C [77 °F], 100 kPa). verify (what is ?) Infobox references

Raspberry ellagitannin is an ellagitannin found in raspberries. It is a polyphenol per se, containing 6 ellagic acid-type components and two additional monomeric phenolics, for a total of 14 gallic acid units (and all of their substituent phenolic hydroxyl groups).
