= Ferric reducing ability of plasma =

Ferric reducing ability of plasma (FRAP, also Ferric ion reducing antioxidant power) is an antioxidant capacity assay that uses Trolox as a standard. The FRAP assay was first performed by Iris Benzie and J. J. Strain of the Human Nutrition Research Group at the University of Ulster, Coleraine. The method is based on the formation of O-Phenanthroline-Fe(2+) complex and its disruption in the presence of chelating agents. This assay is often used to measure the antioxidant capacity of foods, beverages and nutritional supplements containing polyphenols.

== Experimental procedure ==
A reaction mixture containing 1 ml of 0.05% O-Phenanthroline in methanol, 2 ml ferric chloride (200 M) and 2 ml of various concentrations ranging from 10 to 1000 g was incubated at room temperature for 10 min and the absorbance of the same was measured at 510 nm. EDTA was used as a classical metal chelator. The experiment was performed in triplicates. The ferric reducing activity of date seed extract was estimated based on the method of Benzie and Strain (1999). The FRAP reagent was prepared by mixing 50 ml of acetate buffer (0.3 M) at pH 3.6, 5 ml of tripyridyltriazine (TPTZ) solution 10 mM prepared in HCl (40 mM) and 5 ml of ferric chloride solution (FeCl_{3}) (20 mM). 2 ml of the freshly prepared FRAP reagent was added to 10 lL of the extract. Then the absorbance was measured at 593 nm against the blank after 10 min at room temperature. The standard curve was constructed using Trolox. The result was expressed as Trolox equivalent in mg/100 g of dry weight (DW) date seed.
