= Trolox =

Names
- IUPAC name 6-Hydroxy-2,5,7,8-tetramethylchroman-2-carboxylic acid

Identifiers
CAS Number	53188-07-1
3D model (JSmol)	Interactive image
ChEBI	CHEBI:82625
ChEMBL	ChEMBL153
ChemSpider	37117
ECHA InfoCard	100.053.094
PubChem CID	40634
UNII	S18UL9710X
CompTox Dashboard (EPA)	DTXSID60866306
- InChI: InChI=1S/C14H18O4/c1-7-8(2)12-10(9(3)11(7)15)5-6-14(4,18-12)13(16)17/h15H,5-6H2,1-4H3,(H,16,17) Key: GLEVLJDDWXEYCO-UHFFFAOYSA-N
- SMILES: CC1=C(C(=C2CCC(OC2=C1C)(C)C(=O)O)C)O

Properties
Chemical formula	C_{14}H_{18}O_{4}
Molar mass	250.294 g·mol^{−1}
- Except where otherwise noted, data are given for materials in their standard state (at 25 °C [77 °F], 100 kPa). verify (what is ?) Infobox references

Trolox (6-hydroxy-2,5,7,8-tetramethylchroman-2-carboxylic acid) is a water-soluble analog of vitamin E sold by Hoffman-LaRoche. It is an antioxidant like vitamin E and it is used in biological or biochemical applications to reduce oxidative stress or damage.

Trolox equivalent antioxidant capacity (TEAC) is a measurement of antioxidant strength based on Trolox, measured in units called Trolox Equivalents (TE), e.g. micromolTE/100 g. Due to the difficulties in measuring individual antioxidant components of a complex mixture (such as blueberries or tomatoes), Trolox equivalency is used as a benchmark for the antioxidant capacity of such a mixture. Trolox equivalency is most often measured using the ABTS decolorization assay. The TEAC assay is used to measure antioxidant capacity of foods, beverages and supplements. Ferric reducing ability of plasma (FRAP) is an antioxidant capacity assays which uses Trolox as a standard.

Oxygen radical absorbance capacity (ORAC) used to be an alternative measurement, but the United States Department of Agriculture (USDA) withdrew these ratings in 2012 as biologically invalid, stating that "The data for antioxidant capacity of foods generated by in vitro (test-tube) methods cannot be extrapolated to in vivo (human) effects and the clinical trials to test benefits of dietary antioxidants have produced mixed results. We know now that antioxidant molecules in food have a wide range of functions, many of which are unrelated to the ability to absorb free radicals"
