= Antioxidant effect of polyphenols and natural phenols =

Hypothetical type of antioxidant

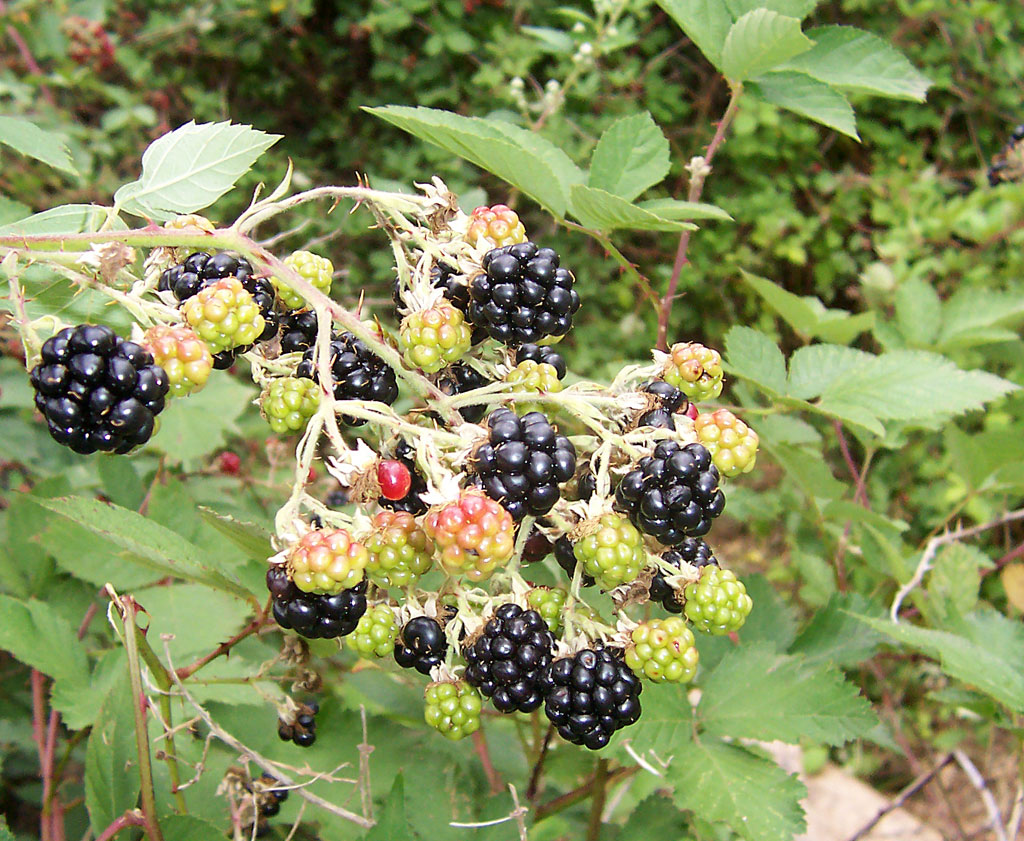
Blackberries are a source of polyphenols.

A polyphenol antioxidant is a hypothesized type of antioxidant studied in vitro. Numbering over 4,000 distinct chemical structures mostly from plants, such polyphenols have not been demonstrated to be antioxidants in vivo.

In vitro at high experimental doses, polyphenols may affect cell-to-cell signaling, receptor sensitivity, inflammatory enzyme activity or gene regulation. None of these hypothetical effects has been confirmed in humans by high-quality clinical research, as of 2025.

== Food sources ==
Polyphenols are found in brightly colored foods, such as blackberries, blueberries, black currants, cherries, cranberries, grapes, plums, raspberries, aronia berries, and elderberries. Some vegetables, such as kale, raw red cabbage, and raw red onions, contain polyphenols, as do red wines, chocolate, black tea, green tea, pecans, and cinnamon.

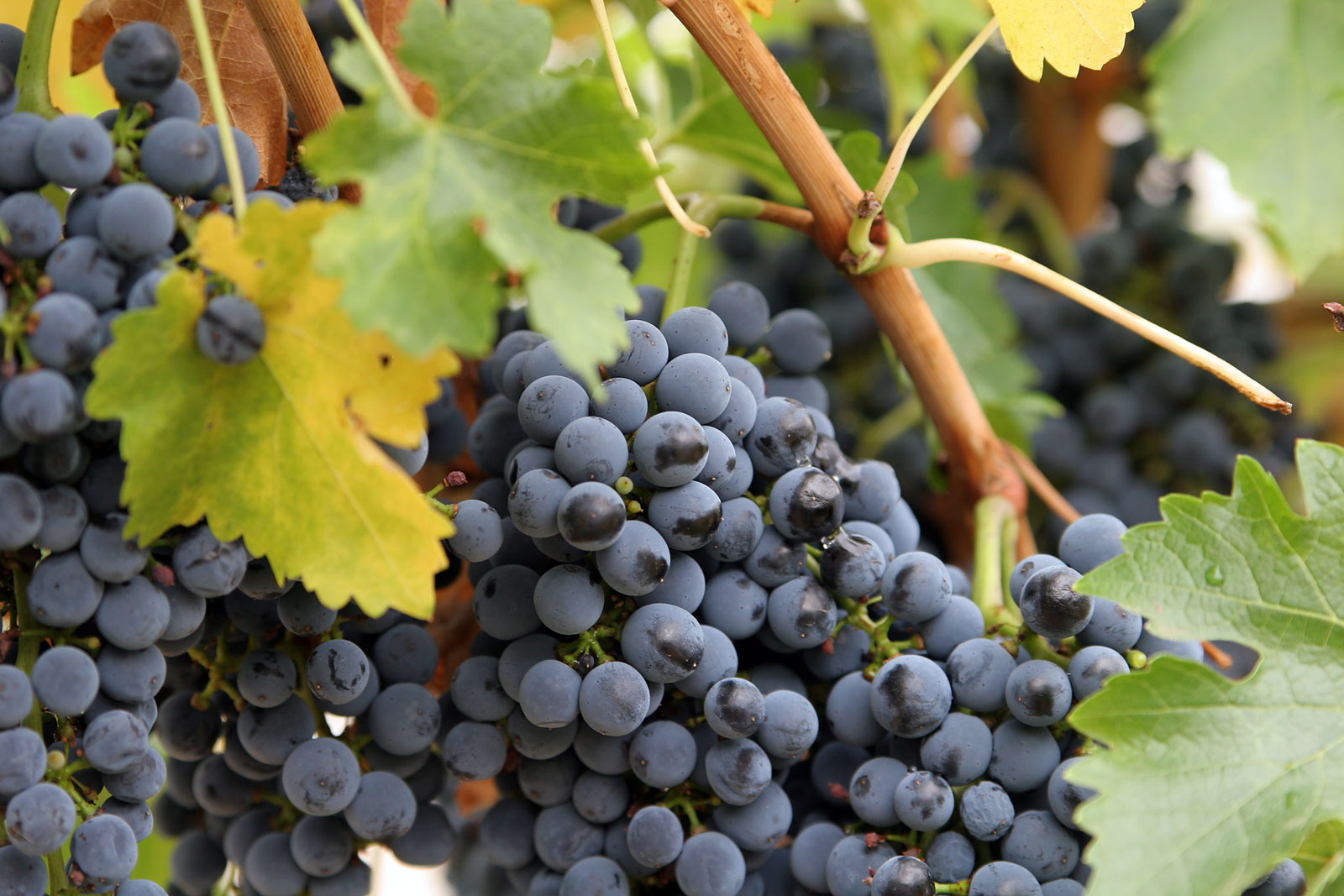
Red grapes contain polyphenols, although there is no evidence that consuming red grapes provides antioxidant effects in vivo

== Biochemical theory ==
The regulation theory considers a polyphenolic ability to scavenge free radicals and up-regulate certain metal chelation reactions. Various reactive oxygen species, such as singlet oxygen, peroxynitrite and hydrogen peroxide, must be continually removed from cells to maintain healthy metabolic function. Diminishing the concentrations of reactive oxygen species can have several benefits possibly associated with ion transport systems and so may affect redox signaling. There is no substantial evidence, however, that dietary polyphenols have an antioxidant effect in vivo.

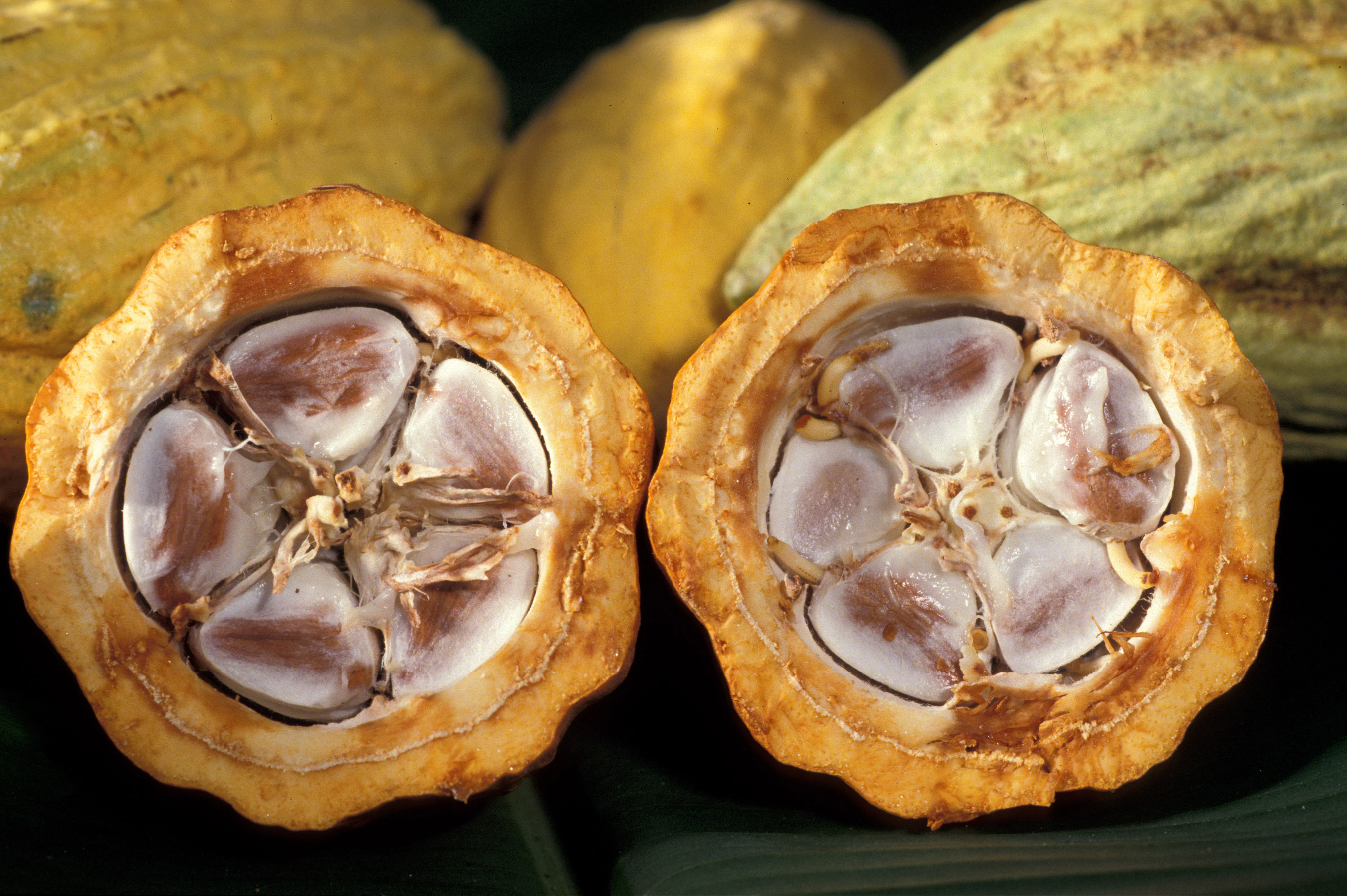
Cocoa, the main ingredient of chocolate, is a source of polyphenols

The "deactivation" of oxidant species by polyphenolic antioxidants (POH) is based, with regard to food systems that are deteriorated by peroxyl radicals (R•), on the donation of hydrogen, which interrupts chain reactions:

R• + PhOH → R-H + PhO•

Phenoxyl radicals (PO•) generated according to this reaction may be stabilized through resonance and/or intramolecular hydrogen bonding, as proposed for quercetin, or combine to yield dimerisation products, thus terminating the chain reaction:

PhO• + PhO•→ PhO-OPh

== Biological fate of dietary polyphenols ==
There is debate regarding the total body absorption of dietary intake of polyphenolic compounds. While some preliminary research indicates potential health effects of certain specific polyphenols, most studies demonstrate their low bioavailability and rapid excretion, indicating unlikely roles in vivo. After consumption, dietary polyphenols are rapidly digested and metabolized into smaller fragments that cannot be traced or assessed for biological functions.

== No proof for nutritional value ==
Preliminary research and regulatory status were reviewed in 2009 by the U.S. Food and Drug Administration, with no recommended Daily Values established, indicating absence of proof for nutritional value.

Other possible effects may result from consumption of foods rich in polyphenols, but are not proved scientifically to be beneficial in humans; accordingly, health claims for polyphenols are not allowed on food labels.

== Difficulty in analyzing effects ==
It is difficult to evaluate the physiological effects of specific polyphenols because a large number of individual phenolic compounds may occur in a single food and their fate in vivo cannot be measured.

The Oxygen Radical Absorbance Capacity (ORAC) test is a laboratory indicator of antioxidant potential in foods and dietary supplements. However, ORAC results cannot be confirmed as physiologically applicable and have been designated as unreliable.

== On skin ==
There is no substantial evidence that reactive oxygen species play a role in the process of skin aging. Controlled long-term studies on the efficacy of low molecular weight antioxidants in the prevention or treatment of skin aging in humans are absent.

== Anthocyanins in vitro ==
Antioxidant levels of purified anthocyanin extracts were much higher than expected from anthocyanin content indicating synergistic effect of anthocyanin mixtures.

== Antioxidant capacity tests ==
- Oxygen radical absorbance capacity (ORAC)
- Ferricyanide reducing power
- 2,2-diphenyl-1-picrylhydrazyl radical scavenging activity

== See also ==
- List of phytochemicals in food
- List of antioxidants in food
- Health effects of polyphenols
- Free-radical theory
- Resveratrol
- Astaxanthin
