= Procyanidin =

Group of chemical compounds

Epicatechin (EC), one of the building blocks of procyanidins

Cyanidin, the anthocyanidin produced when procyanidin are depolymerized under oxidative conditions

Procyanidins are members of the proanthocyanidin (or condensed tannins) class of flavonoids. They are oligomeric compounds, formed from catechin and epicatechin molecules. They yield cyanidin when depolymerized under oxidative conditions.

See the box below entitled "Types of procyanidins" for links to articles on the various types.

== Distribution in plants ==
Procyanidins, including the lesser bioactive / bioavailable polymers (4 or more catechines), represent a group of condensed flavan-3-ols that can be found in many plants, most notably apples, maritime pine bark, cinnamon, aronia fruit, cocoa beans, grape seed, grape skin, and red wines of Vitis vinifera (the common grape). However, bilberry, cranberry, black currant, green tea, black tea, and other plants also contain these flavonoids. Procyanidins can also be isolated from Quercus petraea and Q. robur heartwood (wine barrel oaks). Açaí oil, obtained from the fruit of the açaí palm (Euterpe oleracea), is rich in numerous procyanidin oligomers.

Apples contain on average per serving about eight times the amount of procyanidin found in wine, with some of the highest amounts found in the Red Delicious and Granny Smith varieties.

The seed testas of field beans (Vicia faba) contain procyanidins that affect the digestibility in piglets and could have an inhibitory activity on enzymes. Cistus salviifolius also contains oligomeric procyanidins.

== Analysis ==
Condensed tannins can be characterised by a number of techniques including depolymerisation, asymmetric flow field flow fractionation or small-angle X-ray scattering. DMACA is a dye used for localization of procyanidin compounds in plant histology. The use of the reagent results in blue staining. It can also be used to titrate procyanidins. Total phenols (or antioxidant effect) can be measured using the Folin-Ciocalteu reaction. Results are typically expressed as gallic acid equivalents (GAE).

Procyanidins from field beans (Vicia faba) or barley have been estimated using the vanillin-HCl method, resulting in a red color of the test in the presence of catechin or proanthocyanidins.

Procyanidins can be titrated using the Procyanidolic Index (also called the Bates-Smith Assay). It is a testing method that measures the change in color when the product is mixed with certain chemicals. The greater the color changes, the higher the PCOs content is. However, the Procyanidolic Index is a relative value that can measure well over 100. Unfortunately, a Procyanidolic Index of 95 was erroneously taken to mean 95% PCO by some and began appearing on the labels of finished products. All current methods of analysis suggest that the actual PCO content of these products is much lower than 95%.

An improved colorimetric test, called the Porter Assay or butanol-HCl-iron method, is the most common PCO assay currently in use. The unit of measurement of the Porter Assay is the PVU (Porter Value Unit). The Porter Assay is a chemical test to help determine the potency of procyanidin containing compounds, such as grape seed extract. It is an acid hydrolysis, which splits larger chain units (dimers and trimers) into single unit monomers and oxidizes them. This leads to a colour change, which can be measured using a spectrophotometer. The greater the absorbance at a certain wavelength of light, the greater the potency. Ranges for grape seed extract are from 25 PVU for low grade material to over 300 for premium grape seed extracts.

Gel permeation chromatography (GPC) analysis allows to separate monomers from larger PCO molecules.

Monomers of procyanidins can be characterized by HPLC analysis. Condensed tannins can undergo acid-catalyzed cleavage in the presence of a nucleophile like phloroglucinol (reaction called phloroglucinolysis), thioglycolic acid (thioglycolysis), benzyl mercaptan or cysteamine (processes called thiolysis) leading to the formation of oligomers that can be further analyzed.

Phloroglucinolysis can be used for instance for procyanidins characterisation in wine or in the grape seed and skin tissues.

Thioglycolysis can be used to study procyanidins or the oxidation of condensed tannins. It is also used for lignin quantitation. Reaction on condensed tannins from Douglas fir bark produces epicatechin and catechin thioglycolates.

Condensed tannins from Lithocarpus glaber leaves have been analysed through acid-catalyzed degradation in the presence of cysteamine.

== Research ==
Procyanidin content in dietary supplements has not been well documented. Pycnogenol is a dietary supplement derived from extracts from maritime pine bark that contains 70% procyanidins, and is marketed with claims it can treat many conditions. The medical evidence is insufficient to support its use for the treatment of seven different chronic disorders.

== See also ==
- A type proanthocyanidin
- B type proanthocyanidin
- Procyanidin C1
- Procyanidin C2
- Tannin
- Polyphenol
- Phenolic compounds in wine
