= Proanthocyanidin =

Class of polyphenols found in many plants

Proanthocyanidins are a class of polyphenols found in many plants, such as cranberry, blueberry, and grape seeds. Chemically, they are oligomeric flavonoids. Many are oligomers of catechin and epicatechin and their gallic acid esters. More complex polyphenols, having the same polymeric building block, form the group of condensed tannins.

Proanthocyanidins were discovered in 1947 by Jacques Masquelier, who developed and patented techniques for the extraction of oligomeric proanthocyanidins from pine bark and grape seeds. Proanthocyanidins are under preliminary research for the potential to reduce the risk of urinary tract infections (UTIs) by consuming cranberries, grape seeds or red wine.

== Distribution in plants ==
Proanthocyanidins, including the lesser bioactive and bioavailable polymers (four or more catechins), represent a group of condensed flavan-3-ols, such as procyanidins, prodelphinidins and propelargonidins. They can be found in many plants, most notably apples, maritime pine bark and that of most other pine species, cinnamon, aronia fruit, cocoa beans, grape seed, grape skin (procyanidins and prodelphinidins), and red wines of Vitis vinifera (the European wine grape). However, bilberry, cranberry, black currant, green tea, black tea, and other plants also contain these flavonoids. Cocoa beans contain the highest concentrations. Proanthocyanidins also may be isolated from Quercus petraea and Q. robur heartwood (wine barrel oaks). Açaí oil, obtained from the fruit of the açaí palm (Euterpe oleracea), is rich in numerous procyanidin oligomers.

Apples contain on average per serving about eight times the amount of proanthocyanidin found in wine, with some of the highest amounts found in the Red Delicious and Granny Smith varieties.

An extract of maritime pine bark called Pycnogenol bears 65–75 percent proanthocyanidins (procyanidins). Thus a 100 mg serving would contain 65 to 75 mg of proanthocyanidins (procyanidins).

Proanthocyanidin glycosides can be isolated from cocoa liquor.

The seed testas of field beans (Vicia faba) contain proanthocyanidins that affect the digestibility in piglets and could have an inhibitory activity on enzymes. Cistus salviifolius also contains oligomeric proanthocyanidins.

| Dietary source | Proanthocyanidin (mg/100g) |
|---|---|
| Fruits | |
| Grape seeds | 3532 |
| Blueberries | 332 |
| Apples | 70–141 |
| Pears | 32–42 |
| Nuts | |
| Hazelnuts | 501 |
| Other | |
| Cinnamon bark | 8108 |
| Sorghum grains | 3965 |
| Baking chocolate | 1636 |
| Red wine | 313 |

== Analysis ==
Condensed tannins may be characterised by a number of techniques including depolymerisation, asymmetric flow field flow fractionation or small-angle X-ray scattering.

DMACA is a dye that is particularly useful for localization of proanthocyanidin compounds in plant histology. The use of the reagent results in blue staining. It can also be used to titrate proanthocyanidins.

Proanthocyanidins from field beans (Vicia faba) or barley have been estimated using the vanillin-HCl method, resulting in a red color of the test in the presence of catechins or proanthocyanidins.

Proanthocyanidins can be titrated using the Procyanidolic Index (also called the Bates-Smith Assay). It is a testing method that measures the change in color when the product is mixed with certain chemicals. The greater the color changes, the higher the PCOs content is. However, the Procyanidolic Index is a relative value that can measure well over 100. Unfortunately, a Procyanidolic Index of 95 was erroneously taken to mean 95% PCO by some and began appearing on the labels of finished products. All current methods of analysis suggest that the actual PCO content of these products is much lower than 95%.

Gel permeation chromatography (GPC) analysis allows separation of monomers from larger proanthocyanidin molecules.

Monomers of proanthocyanidins can be characterized by analysis with HPLC and mass spectrometry. Condensed tannins can undergo acid-catalyzed cleavage in the presence of a nucleophile like phloroglucinol (reaction called phloroglucinolysis), thioglycolic acid (thioglycolysis), benzyl mercaptan or cysteamine (processes called thiolysis) leading to the formation of oligomers that can be further analyzed.

Tandem mass spectrometry can be used to sequence proanthocyanidins.

== Oligomeric proanthocyanidins ==
Oligomeric proanthocyanidins (OPC) strictly refer to dimer and trimer polymerizations of catechins. OPCs are found in most plants and thus are common in the human diet. Especially the skin, seeds, and seed coats of purple or red pigmented plants contain large amounts of OPCs. They are dense in grape seeds and skin, and therefore in red wine and grape seed extract, cocoa, nuts and all Prunus fruits (most concentrated in the skin), and in the bark of Cinnamomum (cinnamon) and Pinus pinaster (pine bark; formerly known as Pinus maritima), along with many other pine species. OPCs also can be found in blueberries, cranberries (notably procyanidin A2), aronia, hawthorn, rosehip, and sea buckthorn.

Oligomeric proanthocyanidins can be extracted via Vaccinium pahalae from in vitro cell culture. The US Department of Agriculture maintains a database of botanical and food sources of proanthocyanidins.

=== Plant defense ===
In nature, proanthocyanidins serve among other chemical and induced defense mechanisms against plant pathogens and predators, such as occurs in strawberries.

=== Bioavailability ===
Proanthocyanidin has low bioavailability, with 90% remaining unabsorbed from the intestines until metabolized by gut flora to the more bioavailable metabolites.

=== Non-oxidative chemical depolymerisation ===
Condensed tannins can undergo acid-catalyzed cleavage in the presence of (or an excess of) a nucleophile like phloroglucinol (reaction called phloroglucinolysis), benzyl mercaptan (reaction called thiolysis), thioglycolic acid (reaction called thioglycolysis) or cysteamine. Flavan-3-ol compounds used with methanol produce short-chain procyanidin dimers, trimers, or tetramers which are more absorbable.

These techniques are generally called depolymerisation and give information such as average degree of polymerisation or percentage of galloylation. These are SN1 reactions, a type of substitution reaction in organic chemistry, involving a carbocation intermediate under strongly acidic conditions in polar protic solvents like methanol. The reaction leads to the formation of free and derived monomers that can be further analyzed or used to enhance procyanidin absorption and bioavailability. The free monomers correspond to the terminal units of the condensed tannins chains.

In general, reactions are made in methanol, especially thiolysis, as benzyl mercaptan has a low solubility in water. They involve a moderate (50 to 90 °C) heating for a few minutes. Epimerisation may happen.

Phloroglucinolysis can be used for instance for proanthocyanidins characterisation in wine or in grape seeds and skin.

Thioglycolysis can be used to study proanthocyanidins or the oxidation of condensed tannins. It is also used for lignin quantitation. Reaction on condensed tannins from Douglas fir bark produces epicatechin and catechin thioglycolates.

Condensed tannins from Lithocarpus glaber leaves have been analysed through acid-catalyzed degradation in the presence of cysteamine.

== Research ==
=== Urinary tract infections ===
Cranberries have A2-type proanthocyanidins (PACs) which may be important for the ability of PACs to bind to proteins, such as the adhesins present on E. coli fimbriae and were thought to inhibit bacterial infections, such as urinary tract infections (UTIs). Clinical trials have produced mixed results when asking the question to confirm that PACs, particularly from cranberries, were an alternative to antibiotic prophylaxis for UTIs: 1) a 2014 scientific opinion by the European Food Safety Authority rejected physiological evidence that cranberry PACs have a role in inhibiting bacterial pathogens involved in UTIs; 2) an updated 2023 Cochrane Collaboration review supported the use of cranberry products for the prevention of UTIs for certain groups.

A 2017 systematic review concluded that cranberry products significantly reduced the incidence of UTIs, indicating that cranberry products may be effective particularly for individuals with recurrent infections. In 2019, the American Urological Association released guidelines stating that a moderate level of evidence supports the use of cranberry products containing PACs for possible prevention from recurrent UTIs.

=== Wine consumption ===
Proanthocyanidins are the principal polyphenols in red wine that are under research to assess risk of coronary heart disease and lower overall mortality. With tannins, they also influence the aroma, flavor, mouth-feel and astringency of red wines.

In red wines, total OPC content, including flavan-3-ols (catechins), was substantially higher (177 mg/L) than that in white wines (9 mg/L).

=== Other ===
Proanthocyanidins found in the proprietary extract of maritime pine bark called Pycnogenol were not found (in 2012) to be effective as a treatment for any disease:

"Current evidence is insufficient to support Pycnogenol(®) use for the treatment of any chronic disorder. Well-designed, adequately powered trials are needed to establish the value of this treatment."

== Sources ==
Proanthocyanidins are present in fresh grapes, juice, red wine, and other darkly pigmented fruits such as cranberry, blackcurrant, elderberry, and aronia. Although red wine may contain more proanthocyanidins by mass per unit of volume than does red grape juice, red grape juice contains more proanthocyanidins per average serving size. An eight US fluid ounces (240 ml) serving of grape juice averages 124 milligrams proanthocyanidins, whereas a five US fluid ounces (150 ml) serving of red wine averages 91 milligrams (i.e., 145.6 milligrams per 8 fl. oz. or 240 mL). Many other foods and beverages may also contain proanthocyanidins, but few attain the levels found in red grape seeds and skins, with a notable exception being aronia, which has the highest recorded level of proanthocyanidins among fruits assessed to date (664 milligrams per 100 g).

== See also ==
- A type proanthocyanidin
- B type proanthocyanidin
- Tannin
- Polyphenol
- Phenolic compounds in wine
