= Condensed tannin =

Polymers formed by the condensation of flavans

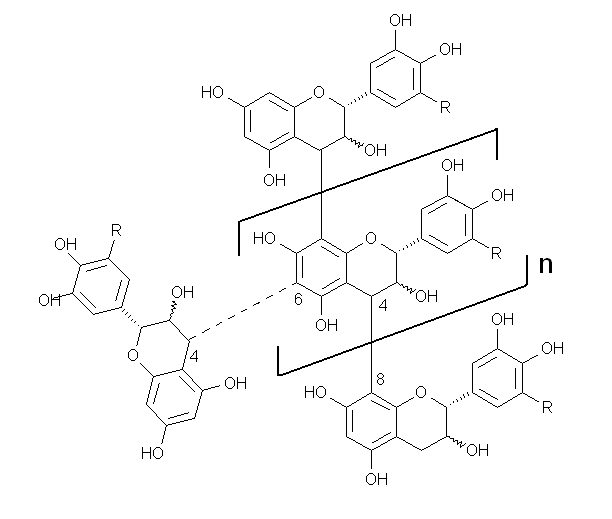
Schematic representation of a condensed tannin molecule. Condensed tannins can be linear (with 4→8 bounds) or branched (with 4→6 bounds - dotted line).

Condensed tannins (proanthocyanidins, polyflavonoid tannins, catechol-type tannins, pyrocatecollic type tannins, non-hydrolyzable tannins or flavolans) are polymers formed by the condensation of flavans. They do not contain sugar residues.

They are called proanthocyanidins as they yield anthocyanidins when depolymerized under oxidative conditions. Different types of condensed tannins exist, such as the procyanidins, propelargonidins, prodelphinidins, profisetinidins, proteracacinidins, proguibourtinidins or prorobinetidins. All of the above are formed from flavan-3-ols, but flavan-3,4-diols, called (leucoanthocyanidin) also form condensed tannin oligomers, e.g. leuco-fisetinidin form profisetinidin, and flavan-4-ols form condensed tannins, e.g. 3',4',5,7-flavan-4-ol form proluteolinidin (luteoforolor). One particular type of condensed tannin, found in grape, are procyanidins, which are polymers of 2 to 50 (or more) catechin units joined by carbon-carbon bonds. These are not susceptible to being cleaved by hydrolysis.

While many hydrolyzable tannins and most condensed tannins are water-soluble, several tannins are also highly octanol-soluble. Some large condensed tannins are insoluble. Differences in solubilities are likely to affect their biological functions.

== Natural occurrences ==
Tannins of tropical woods tend to be of a catechin nature rather than of the gallic type present in temperate woods.

Condensed tannins can be recovered from Lithocarpus glaber or can be found in Prunus sp. The bark of Commiphora angolensis contains condensed tannins.

Commercial sources of condensed tannins are plants such as quebracho wood (Schinopsis lorentzii), mimosa bark (Acacia mollissima), grape seeds (Vitis vinifera), pine barks and spruce barks.

Condensed tannins are formed in tannosomes, specialized organelles, in Tracheophytes, i.e. vascular plants.

== Dietary supplement ==
Pycnogenol is a dietary supplement derived from extracts from maritime pine bark, is standardised to contain 70% procyanidin and is marketed with claims it can treat many conditions; however, according to a 2020 Cochrane review, the evidence is insufficient to support its use for the treatment of any chronic disorder.

== Analysis ==
Condensed tannins can be characterised by a number of modern techniques including depolymerisation, asymmetric flow field flow fractionation, small-angle X-ray scattering and MALDI-TOF mass spectrometry. Their interactions with proteins can be studied by isothermal titration calorimetry and this provides information on the affinity constant, enthalpy and stoichiometry in the tannin-protein complex.

=== Depolymerisation ===
Depolymerisation reactions are mainly analytical techniques but it is envisaged to use them as means to produce molecules for the chemical industry derived from waste products, such as bark from the wood industry or pomaces from the wine industry.

Depolymerisation is an indirect method of analysis allowing to gain information such as average degree of polymerisation, percentage of galloylation, etc. The depolymerised sample can be injected on a mass spectrometer with an electrospray ionization source, only able to form ions with smaller molecules.

==== Oxidative depolymerisation ====
The butanol–hydrochloric acid–iron assay (Porter assay) is a colorimetric assay. It is based on acid catalysed oxidative depolymerization of condensed tannins into corresponding anthocyanidins. The method has also been used for determination of bound condensed tannins, but has limitations. This reagent has recently been improved considerably by inclusion of acetone.

==== Non-oxidative chemical depolymerisation ====
The condensed tannins can nevertheless undergo acid-catalyzed cleavage in the presence of (an excess of) a nucleophile like phloroglucinol (reaction called phloroglucinolysis), benzyl mercaptan (reaction called thiolysis), thioglycolic acid (reaction called thioglycolysis) or cysteamine. These techniques are generally called depolymerisation and give information such as average degree of polymerisation or percentage of galloylation. These are SN1 reactions, a type of substitution reaction in organic chemistry, involving a carbocation intermediate under strongly acidic conditions in polar protic solvents like methanol. The reaction leads to the formation of free and derived monomers that can be further analyzed. The free monomers correspond to the terminal units of the condensed tannins chains. If thiolysis is done directly on plant material (rather than on purified tannins), it is, however, important to subtract naturally occurring free flavanol monomers from the concentration of terminal units that are released during depolymerisation.

Reactions are generally made in methanol, especially thiolysis, as benzyl mercaptan has a low solubility in water. They involve a moderate (40 to 90 °C (104 to 194 °F)) heating for a few minutes. Epimerisation may happen.

Phloroglucinolysis can be used for instance for proanthocyanidins characterisation in wine or in the grape seed and skin tissues.

Thioglycolysis can be used to study proanthocyanidins or the oxidation of condensed tannins. It is also used for lignin quantitation. Reaction on condensed tannins from Douglas fir bark produces epicatechin and catechin thioglycolates.

Condensed tannins from Lithocarpus glaber leaves have been analysed through acid-catalyzed degradation in the presence of cysteamine.
