= C3H6O2S =

The molecular formula C_{3}H_{6}O_{2}S (molar mass: 106.14 g/mol, exact mass: 106.0089 u) may refer to:

- Thiolactic acid (2-mercaptopropionic acid)
- 3-Mercaptopropionic acid (3-MPA)
