= Transgender people and facial hair =

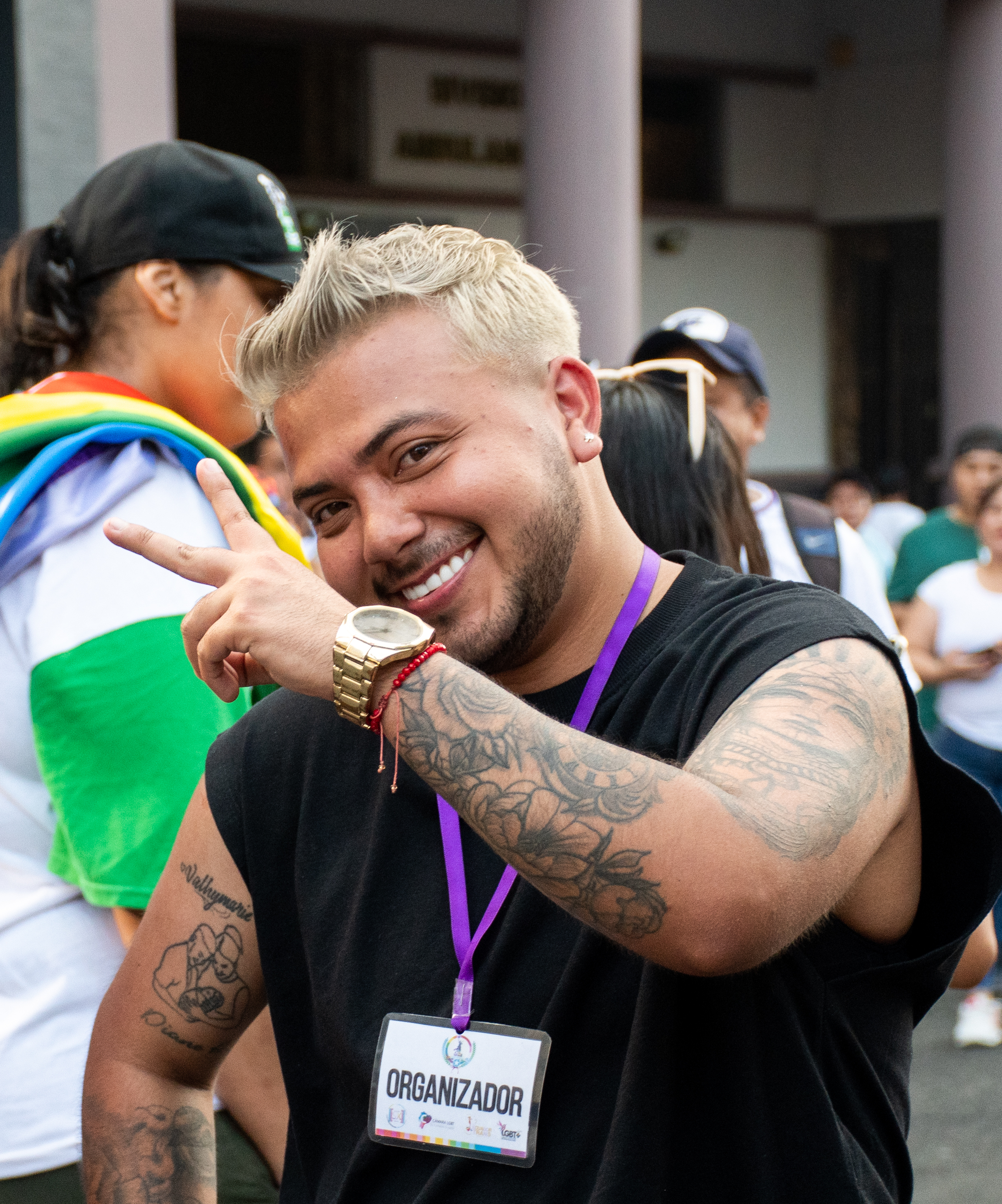
A transgender man with facial hair

For many transgender people, the removal, addition, or modification of facial hair is an important part of transitioning. These effects are often pursued through methods including hormone replacement therapy, shaving, and topical treatments.

== Transgender men ==
Growth of facial hair is often, though not always, a desirable element of gender transition for transgender men. Taking testosterone as part of hormone replacement therapy is a common method for starting or increasing facial hair growth, and some transgender men have reported using topical treatments like minoxidil to improve their facial hair.

== Transgender women ==
Many transgender women experience significant mental burden as a result of facial hair and seek to remove it. This is most commonly done via shaving, but alternative temporary measures include epilation, depilatory creams, and waxing. Permanent measures for hair removal include laser hair removal and hair electrolysis. The use of feminizing hormone replacement therapy has been shown to have an effect of reducing facial hair, particularly in adolescents.

== Non-binary people ==
People who are non-binary and genderqueer often combine elements of both typically-masculine and typically-feminine gender expression. As the presence of facial hair is typically identified with masculine presentation, genderqueer models will often combine facial hair with other more feminine characteristics (e.g., makeup and earrings).
