= DMACA =

DMACA may refer to:

- DMACA reagent or p-dimethylaminocinnamaldehyde, a dye used to detect proanthocyanidins polyphenolic compounds in plants
- DMACA crystal (or [NH_{2}(CH_{3})_{2}]_{3}Sb_{2}Cl_{9}), a crystal showing ferroelectric phase transition studied in vibrational spectroscopy
- 7-dimethylaminocoumarin-4-acetic acid (C_{13}H_{13}NO_{4}, molar mass : 247.25 g/mol, CAS number : 80883-54-1),
