= Olive Lee Benson =

American hair stylist and businesswoman

- Born: 1932; Cambridge, Massachusetts, U.S.
- Died: 2005 (aged 72–73)

Olive Lee Benson was a hair stylist and businesswoman in Boston.

== Life ==
Benson was born in Cambridge, MA and attended Cambridge High & Latin School. She then earned a diploma and certification in hairdressing and styling from the Wilfred Academy. She opened her salon in North Cambridge where she served primarily African American women.

In 2004, Benson was a director of styling for the Democratic National Convention in Boston. She became the director of Education for Soft Sheen, L'Oreal and developed the first universal relaxer.

Benson was the first African American inducted into the National Cosmetology Association's Hall of Renown and was awarded the National Hairstyle Award. She was a board member of Intercoiffure Mondial. In 2023, she was recognized as one of "Boston’s most admired, beloved, and successful Black Women leaders" by the Black Women Lead project.
