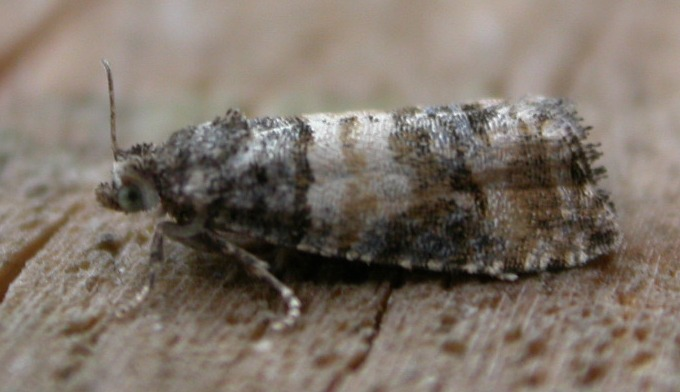

Scientific classification
- Kingdom: Animalia
- Phylum: Arthropoda
- Clade: Pancrustacea
- Class: Insecta
- Order: Lepidoptera
- Family: Tortricidae
- Genus: Piniphila
- Species: P. bifasciana

Binomial name
- Piniphila bifasciana Haworth, 1811

= Piniphila bifasciana =

Species of moth

Piniphila bifasciana is a moth of the family Tortricidae. It is found in Europe and across the Palearctic to Japan.

The wingspan is 12–16 mm. The forewings have a slightly arched costa. The ground colour is silvery-whitish, with pale greyish-ochreous striae, posteriorly confluent in the disc. The costa is marked with blackish. The basal patch has a nearly straight edge. The central fascia is evenly broad and posteriorly indented below the middle, and there is a slender terminal streak. All are pale greyish-ochreous mixed with pale silver grey and irrorated with black. The hindwings are light grey.

The adults fly from June to July depending on the location.

The larvae feed on Pinus sylvestris and Pinus pinaster.
