= C2H7NO2S =

The molecular formula C_{2}H_{7}NO_{2}S (molar mass: 109.15 g/mol) may refer to:

- 1-Aminoethanesulfinic acid
- Ammonium thioglycolate
- Dimethylsulfuramidous acid
- Ethanesulfonamide
- 2-Hydroxyethanesulfinamide
- Hypotaurine
- N-Methoxymethanesulfinamide
- N-Methylmethanesulfonamide
- 1-(Methylsulfonyl)methanamine
