= Grape seed extract =

Industrial derivative of grape seeds

Grape seed extract is an industrial derivative of whole grape seeds. The extract (GSPE) contains proanthocyanidins. Grape seed extract quality is measured by the content of procyanidins which are formed from proanthocyanidins. Generally, grape seed extract quality contains 95% procyanidins, but potency varies among products. Eating foods or beverages high in procyanidin results in an astringent sensation in the mouth.

== Extraction method ==
The properties of grape seed extract depend on the extraction process used to obtain it and how the grapes were grown. The classic method incorporates extraction with organic solvents such as acetone, acetonitrile, ethyl acetate, and methanol. Other methods using hot water have been used, but they are not as effective at maximizing extract production in both quantity and efficiency. High performance liquid chromatography seems to be the most effective analysis along with proton NMR spectroscopy with principal component analysis to ensure accurate composition.

== Supplement use and research ==
Grape seed extract is sold as a dietary supplement. Oral administration of grape seed extract (dose and frequency unreported) was well tolerated in people over 14 weeks. Side effects may include itchy scalp, dizziness, headache, and nausea.

A 2019 meta-analysis suggested that grape seed extract might help to lower concentrations of LDL cholesterol, total cholesterol, triglycerides, and the inflammatory marker, C-reactive protein. However, each of the studies was small in size, possibly affecting interpretation of the analysis.

A 2016 meta-analysis concluded that grape seed extract, in a dose of under 800 milligrams per day over at least 8 weeks, might help to reduce systolic and diastolic blood pressure. People with metabolic syndrome had a more significant outcome (average of a 8½ mmHg decrease in systolic blood pressure) than in healthy subjects. The authors concluded that heterogeneity in the study designs and small sample sizes involved in the meta-analysis introduced uncertainty in the results, and that larger-scale, long-term, multiple-dose studies in people with high blood pressure were warranted.

== Cancer ==
Grape seed extract has been incorrectly described as a cancer cure on social media websites. There is no clinical evidence that grape seed extract is effective to treat cancer. In 2017, the Food and Drug Administration listed grape seed extract as a fake cancer cure that consumers should avoid.
