= National Honor Society =

American high school honor organization

- Founded: March 1, 1921; 105 years ago Fifth Avenue High School
- Type: Honor
- Affiliation: National Association of Secondary School Principals
- Status: Active
- Emphasis: High school and Middle school
- Scope: International
- Pillars: Scholarship, Character, Leadership, and Service
- Colors: Blue and Gold
- Chapters: 17,000+
- Members: 1.4 million active
- Headquarters: c/o/ National Association of Secondary School Principals; 1904 Association Drive; Reston, Virginia 20191-1537; United States
- Website: www.nationalhonorsociety.org

The National Honor Society (NHS) is a co-curricular high school student organization with 1.4 million members. The purpose of the NHS is to create interest for scholarship, to recognize outstanding students, to stimulate a desire to render service, to promote leadership. Membership in local NHS chapters is bestowed upon a student by a Faculty Council and is based on the four pillars of NHS: scholarship, character, leadership, and service.

== History ==
The National Honor Society (NHS) was established on March 1, 1921, by Edward Rynearson, a member of the National Association of Secondary School Principals (NASSP), which is the parent organization of the NHS. Rynearson, then the principal of Fifth Avenue High School in Pittsburgh, Pennsylvania, envisioned an organization that would balance academics and athletics while emphasizing the role of high schools as a foundation for democracy. Prior to the establishment of the NHS, numerous local and regional honor societies existed, but the NHS was the first organization of its kind with a national scope.

Since its inception, the NHS has expanded significantly, with over 17,000 active chapters across the United States and beyond.

In 1929, the NHS furthered its reach by introducing the National Junior Honor Society (NJHS) for middle school students. This expansion was complemented in 2008 with the creation of the National Elementary Honor Society, a collaboration between the NASSP and the National Association of Elementary School Principals (NAESP), aimed at elementary school students.

The NHS operates through a decentralized model, granting autonomy to local chapters for innovation and adaptation within the framework of the NHS National Constitution. This approach allows chapters to address specific local needs while adhering to the overarching principles of the organization.

The operational management of the NHS is overseen by the NASSP, with strategic guidance provided by the NASSP Board of Directors. This structure ensures the continuity of Rynearson's vision and the organization's impact on students' lives.

== Symbols ==
The four pillars of NHS are scholarship, character, leadership, and service. Its colors are blue and gold.

== Chapters ==
National Honor Society chapters operate in all fifty states, territories, and many schools around the world, engaging and serving more than 1.4 million students.

== Activities ==
Each year, the average NHS chapter contributes:

- 1,000 hours of school/community service
- $26,000 in charitable donations
- 1,000 pounds of food to local, state, and national causes

Since 1946, the National Association of Secondary School Principals (NASSP) has awarded more than $23 million in scholarships to outstanding NHS seniors. Each year, NASSP awards $2 million in scholarships to 600 students, including one National Winner ($25,000), four NHS Pillar Winners ($10,625) 20 national finalists ($5,625 each), and 575 national semifinalists ($3,200 each). Scholarship recipients are selected based on their demonstration of the four pillars of NHS: scholarship, service, leadership, and character.

== Sister organizations ==
- National Junior Honor Society
- National Elementary Honor Society
- National Student Council

== Notable members ==
- Pope Leo XIV

=== Arts ===
Name	Chapter	State
Alda, Alan	St. Thomas More High School	NY
Besterman, Doug	Ramapo High School	NY
Bodett, Tom	Sturgis High School	MI
Bradley, David	Bedford High School	PA
Cameron, Peter	Castlemont High School	CA
Cavett, Dick	Lincoln High School	NE
Cobb, Lee J.	Redford High School	MI
Couric, Katie	Yorktown High School	VA
Crawford, Cindy	DeKalb High School	IL
Davis, Jim	Madison-Grant High School	IN
Estefan, Gloria	Our Lady of Lourdes Academy	FL
Farr, Jamie	Woodward High School	OH
Fey, Tina	Upper Darby High School	PA
Francis, Connie	Belleville High School	NJ
Gangemi, Joseph	Concord High School	DE
Goldberger, Paul	Nutley High School	NJ
Gross, Michael	Kelvyn Park High School	IL
Guy, Jasmine	Northside High School	GA
Harold, Erika	Urbana High School	IL
Henson, Jim	Northwestern Senior High School	MD
Lachey, Vanessa Minnillo	Bishop England High School	SC
Lynds, Gayle	Abraham Lincoln High School	IA
Mangione, Chuck	Franklin High School	NY
Morris, Sarah	Hutchison School	TN
Phillips, Stone	Parkway West High School	MO
Rogers, Fred	Latrobe High School	PA
Stewart, Jon	Lawrence High School	NJ
Streep, Meryl	Bernards High School	NJ
Swift, Taylor	Hendersonville High School	TN
Underwood, Carrie	Checotah High School	OK
Vinton, Will	McMinnville High School	OR
Voight, Jon	St. Thomas More High School	NY
Zindel, Paul	Port Richmond High School	NY

=== Education/Science/Business ===
Name	Chapter	State
Allen, Joseph	Crawfordsville High School	IN
Bastian, Bruce	Twin Falls High School	ID
Bobko, Karol	Brooklyn Tech High School	NY
Cerullo, Leonard	Hazleton High School	PA
Dole, Elizabeth	Salisbury High School	NC
Iacocca, Lee	Allentown High School	PA
Keith, Leroy	Howard School of Academics and Technology	TN
McGuire, Patricia	Merion Mercy Academy	PA
McMonagle, Donald	Hamady High School	MI
Morava, Jack	Mercedes High School	TX
Penzias, Arno	Brooklyn Tech High School	NY
Plunkett, Roy	Newton High School	OH
Quinn, Jane Bryant	Niagara Falls High School	NY
Resnik, Judith	Firestone High School	OH
Silkwood, Karen	Nederland High School	TX
Whitson, Peggy	Mount Ayr High School	IA

=== Politics/Military ===
Name	Chapter	State
Acton, Amy	Liberty High School	OH
Agrast, Mark	Charles F. Brush High School	OH
Battani, Marianne	Tuscola Community High School	IL
Bingaman, Jeff	Silver High School	NM
Block, John	Knoxville High School	IL
Brown, Joanne	Notre Dame High School	GU
Chiles, Lawton	Lakeland High School	FL
Cohen, William	Bangor High School	ME
Corzine, Jon	Taylorsville High School	OH
Ford, Gerald R.	Grand Rapids South High School	MI
Gabriel, Charles A.	Lincolnton High School	NC
Gonzalez, Felix	Riverside Military Academy	GA
Gray, William H.	Simon Gratz High School	PA
Griffin, Marc L.	Beech Grove High School	IN
Hastings, William C.	Newman Grove High School	NE
Hinojosa, Ruben	Mercedes High School	TX
Jackson, Henry "Scoop"	Everett High School	WA
Kirkpatrick, Jeane	Mt. Vernon Township High School	IL
Martin, Kevin	Charlotte Catholic High School	NC
McKernan, John R.	Bangor High School	ME
Miller, Robert	Bishop Garmon High School	NV
Robinson, Michelle	Whitney Young High School	IL
Moffard, Rose	Globe High School	AZ
Rodham, Hillary	Maine South High School	IL
Spade, Douglas	Camden-Frontier High School	MI
Sullivan, Mike	Douglas High School	WY
Trail, Jeffrey	DeKalb High School	IL
Van Epps, Matt	Mentor High School	OH
Yellowtail, William	Lodge Grass High School	MT

=== Sports ===
Name	Chapter	State
Aikman, Troy	Henryetta High School	OK
Atwater, Steve	Lutheran High School North	MO
Bell, Earl	Jonesboro High School	AR
Belote, Melissa	Robert E. Lee High School	VA
Everett, Jim	Eldorado High School	NM
Fitzgerald-Brown, Benita	Gar-Field High School	VA
Gilbert, Gale	Red Bluff High School	CA
Glenn, Mike	Coosa High School	GA
Grogan, Steve	Ottawa High School	KS
Hoying, Bob	St. Henry High School	OH
Huber, Vicki	Concord High School	DE
Jansen, Dan	West Allis Central High School	WI
King, Lilly	F. J. Reitz High School	IN
Kinnick, Nil	Benson High School	NE
Lucas, Jerry	Middletown High School	OH
Monroe, Henry	Ben C. Rain High School	AL
Mulkey, Kim	Exeter Turnpike High School	PA
Ripken, Cal Jr.	Aberdeen High School	MD

== See also ==
- Honor society
- High school fraternities and sororities
