= Relaxer =

Hair straightening product

A relaxer is a type of lotion or cream generally used by people with tight curls or very curly hair which makes hair easier to straighten by chemically "relaxing" the natural curls. The active agent is usually a strong alkali, although some formulations are based on ammonium thioglycolate or formaldehyde.

== History ==
The first documented history of the relaxer began with Garrett Augustus Morgan in 1909. His hair straighten cream was found accidentally when trying to find a solution to ease friction on sewing machines in his tailor shop. Morgan tested his cream on a neighboring dog's fur. With the success of the cream, he established G.A. Morgan Hair Refining Company and began selling his product to Black/mixed people.

== General usage ==
Hair relaxing, or lanthionization, colloquially known as a perm, can be performed by a professional cosmetologist in a salon, a professional barber in a barbershop or at home with relaxer kits. As with hair dye, the treated portion of the hair moves away from the scalp as the new growth of untreated hair sprouts up from the roots, requiring periodic retreatment (about every 8–11 weeks) to maintain a consistent appearance.

The relaxer is applied to the base of the hair shaft and remains in place for a "cooking" interval, during which it alters the hair's texture by a process of controlled damage to the protein structure. The hair can be significantly weakened by the physical overlap of excessive applications or by a single excessive one, leading to brittleness, breakage, or even widespread alopecia.

When the relaxer has worked to the desired degree, the hair is rinsed clean. Regardless of formula, relaxers are always alkaline to some degree, so it is prudent to neutralize or even slightly acidify the hair with a suitable shampoo immediately afterward. The prompt use of hair conditioner is also important in order to replace some of the natural oils that were stripped away by the process.

== Types ==
=== Thio relaxers ===
Thio relaxers use ATG, or ammonium thioglycolate, which is also used in permanent waving, but at a much higher pH and concentration than used in permanent waves. It is usually higher than a pH of 10. These relaxers are also thicker with a higher viscosity, or thickness, which makes for an easier relaxer application. Thio relaxers break the disulfide bonds in hair, similar to the permanent waving process. When enough of the disulfide bonds in the hair are broken, the relaxer is rinsed from the hair and the hair is towel dried. After towel drying, a neutralizer of some sort is applied to the hair.

=== Alkaline and lye relaxers ===
Garrett Augustus Morgan observed that it is possible to change the basic structure of the hair shaft when certain chemicals penetrate the cuticle layer. Hair relaxing products often require washing and combing with soap which had been made with excess lye. The scalp can suffer severe chemical burns if over exposed to lye or no-lye relaxers.

A lye relaxer consists of sodium hydroxide (also known as NaOH or lye) mixed with water, petroleum jelly, mineral oil, and emulsifiers to create a creamy consistency. On application, the caustic "lye cream" permeates the protein structure of the hair and weakens its internal bonds, causing the natural curls to loosen out as the entire fiber swells open. No special deactivation step is required after washing the lye cream out, other than the routine pH adjustment and hair-conditioning.

Manufacturers vary the sodium hydroxide content of the solution from 5% to 10% and the pH between 10 and 14.

==== "Base" and "no base" formulas ====
Entirely distinct from the chemical concept of base as a wider definition for "alkaline", lye relaxers may be labelled as "base" or "no base". In this instance, the "base" refers to a preliminary coating of petroleum jelly onto the scalp to protect it from being irritated or burned by the lye cream. "No base" creams have a lower concentration of lye and may be applied directly to the hair roots without requiring the protective "base" layer, although these weaker products may still irritate the skin of some people who must therefore coat their scalps beforehand anyway.

=== "No lye" relaxers ===
Because of increasing awareness of the potential dangers of sodium hydroxide found in traditional relaxer formulas, many women have begun abandoning them. "No-lye" relaxers have become increasingly popular. "No-lye" relaxers are of three main types. One type operates on the same general principle as lye relaxers but uses a slightly weaker alkaline agent, such as potassium hydroxide, lithium hydroxide, or guanidine hydroxide. The last of these is not pre-formulated, but rather is generated at the time of use by combining a cream containing calcium hydroxide (slaked lime) with an "activating solution" of guanidine carbonate.

Another type of "no-lye" relaxer uses ammonium thioglycolate, which is also known as perm salt for its use in permanent waves. Perm salt is a chemical reducing agent which selectively weakens the hair's cystine bonds instead of disrupting the entire protein, but strips out the natural oils even more thoroughly than the alkali hydroxide products. Afterward, the thioglycolate must be oxidized with a special solution of hydrogen peroxide or sodium bromate.

Lastly, in most relaxers sold for home use, the active agents are ammonium sulfite and ammonium bisulfite (the two compounds are interchangeable, depending on the surrounding pH). These also selectively reduce the cystine bonds, but are much weaker and work more slowly. Nevertheless, their mild action minimizes (but does not entirely eliminate) collateral irritation to the skin.

=== Commercial sale ===
Early in the 1900s hair relaxing products emerged, such as "G.A. brandi's hair Cream." Sale of "lye relaxers" began in 1917 by companies such as Proline. They also produced the first commercial "no lye relaxer" using potassium hydroxide in 1919.

A product falsely marketed as chemical-free in the 1990s, the Rio Hair Naturalizer System, led to a class action lawsuit against the manufacturer, the World Rio Corporation Inc., when the acidic chemicals it contained caused scalp damage and/or hair loss to thousands of users. The product was eventually withdrawn from the market.

=== Down perm ===
A Down Perm (Korean: 다운 펌) is a type of hair relaxing product used in Asia with its origins in South Korea. It is designed to relax Asian hair which tends to stick out, most noticeably after washing it.

== Risks ==
There are growing concerns about the use of relaxers, as they may cause harmful effects, including scalp damage, hair brittleness and weakening, kidney injury, disruptions to puberty and fertility, as well as an increased risk of certain cancers. The hair of some Africans is elliptical in shape and therefore very tightly curled (east Asian hair tends to be round and European hair is in-between). The relaxer cream breaks down the chemical bonds of the hair shaft, disrupting the elliptical shape and reconstructing the bonds in a different way. Though hair follicles themselves are not damaged, the hair can become very brittle and break off. There is also risk of scalp burns, irritant and allergic contact dermatitis if the relaxer comes into contact with the skin. Some professionals apply a scalp base cream or protector prior to application to protect the client's scalp from chemical burns.

Cosmetic products are not subject to pre-market approval by the Food and Drug Administration and a complete list of ingredients is not mandatory; however many brands of hair relaxers list phthalate directly as one of their chemical ingredients. Phthalates from cosmetic products can be inhaled or absorbed by the skin and these have been shown to have estrogenic effects in cell models and experimental animals. It also can cause long-term damage that may not recover.

=== Uterine leiomyomata ===
A prospective cohort study of more than 22,000 African-American women showed an association between the use of relaxers and risk of uterine leiomyomata. The incidence of this disease is 2 to 3 times higher in African-Americans than Caucasian women. However, the paper makes no causal connections between relaxers and uterine fibroids, even though some media outlets have reported otherwise. A prospective cohort study published in 2025 of 4,162 African-American women showed there may be an association between use of chemical relaxer during adolescence and early onset of fibroid development, but also explains that misclassification and bias should be considered.

=== Breast cancer ===
A potential causal link between relaxers and breast cancer was found by researchers associated with the Black Women’s Health Study

In 2023, the Food and Drug Administration proposed a ban on using the chemical formaldehyde as an ingredient in hair relaxers, citing its link to cancer and other long-term adverse health effects.

=== Uterine cancer ===
An NIH study published in 2022 found a link between the use of hair straightening chemicals ("relaxers") with an increased risk of developing uterine cancer. Women who used these chemicals regularly were more likely to develop uterine cancer, the risk increasing with the frequency of use. The article reports on a study conducted by the National Institutes of Health (NIH) that found a potential link between the use of hair straightening chemicals and an increased risk of uterine cancer. Researchers discovered that women who used these products frequently had a higher risk of developing uterine cancer, with a particularly elevated risk among those who used them more often. The study used data from the NIH-AARP Diet and Health Study, involving more than 33,000 women, and examined the relationship between personal care product use and cancer risk. The results showed that frequent users of hair straightening products had a nearly doubled risk of uterine cancer compared to those who did not use them. The NIH urges further research to fully understand the long-term effects of these chemicals on women’s health, especially as hair straighteners are widely used in the U.S. and other countries.

=== Hair damage ===
Serious adverse risk of relaxers like cancer and uterine leiomyomata are still unclear in their connection to relaxer use, but there are other adverse effects. A study done over a cross-sectional questionnaire discusses the harmful effects of chemical hair relaxers, highlighting that a majority of users experience negative consequences.This study of 90 women revealed that common issues included frizzy hair, dandruff, hair loss, and thinning. Despite their popularity for ease of use and beauty practices, the relaxers were linked to significant hair damage. The findings suggest that the adverse effects are widespread and emphasize the need for safer alternatives. This may challenge the misconception that relaxers-use is not associated with risks.

=== Legal actions ===
Recent studies and legal actions have raised concerns about the potential health risks of chemical hair straighteners, particularly those containing formaldehyde. Prolonged exposure to these products has been linked to respiratory issues, skin irritations, headaches, and an increased risk of certain cancers, including uterine, endometrial, breast, and ovarian cancers. In response, numerous lawsuits have been filed against manufacturers for failing to disclose these risks.

== See also ==
- Kinky hair
- Hair iron
- Hot comb
- Natural hair
- Perm (hairstyle)
