= Leroy Keith =

Eighth president of Morehouse College

8th President of Morehouse College
- In office 1987 – 1994
- Preceded by: Hugh Gloster
- Succeeded by: Walter E. Massey

Personal details
- Spouse: Anita Keith
- Education: Morehouse College, Indiana University

Leroy Keith Jr. (born 1939) is a businessman and educator, the eighth president of Morehouse College, its second alumni President. Keith helped to double Morehouse's endowment from $27 million in 1987 to $60 million in 1993. However he resigned from Morehouse in 1994 after a financial audit found that the fringe benefits he received from the college, including a college-owned house, could jeopardize the school's tax status."

Keith was appointed chancellor of the Massachusetts Board of Higher Education in 1975, the first African American to hold such a position in the US. He was executive vice president of the University of Massachusetts System, and associate dean of the college and assistant professor of education and urban studies at Dartmouth College.

In 1997, Keith executed a buyout of Carson Products—makers of Dark & Lovely and Magic Shave—becoming its first African American chairman and CEO. Under his management, the company quadrupled in value and became a publicly traded company.

== Personal life ==
Keith is married to Anita Keith and they have four daughters.
