= Pentaerythritol tetrakis(3-mercaptopropionate) =

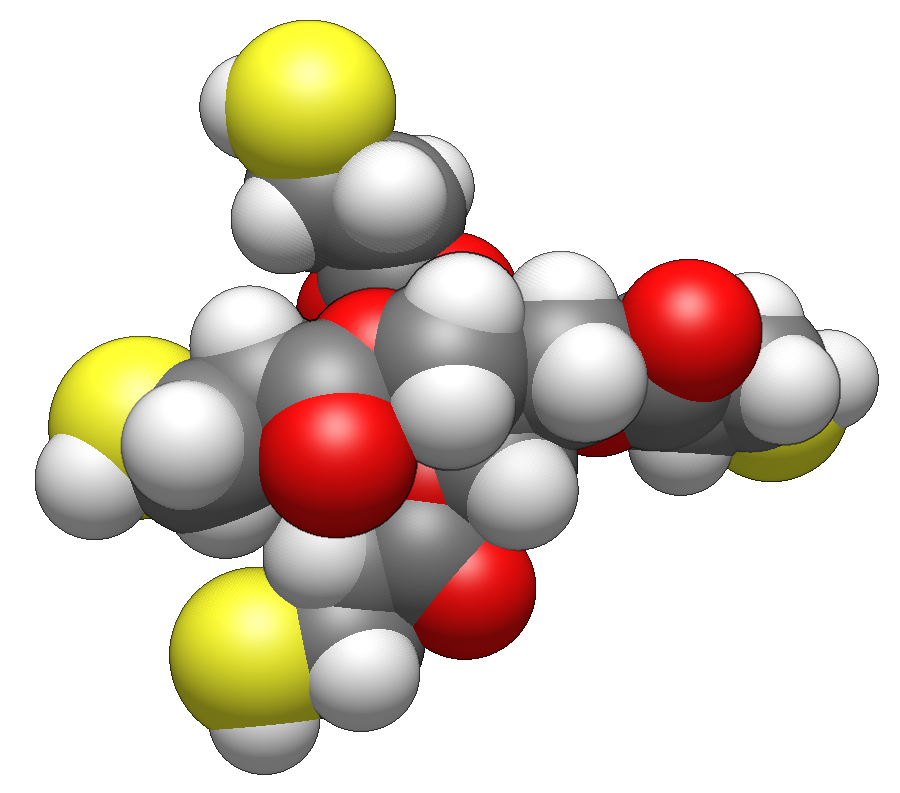

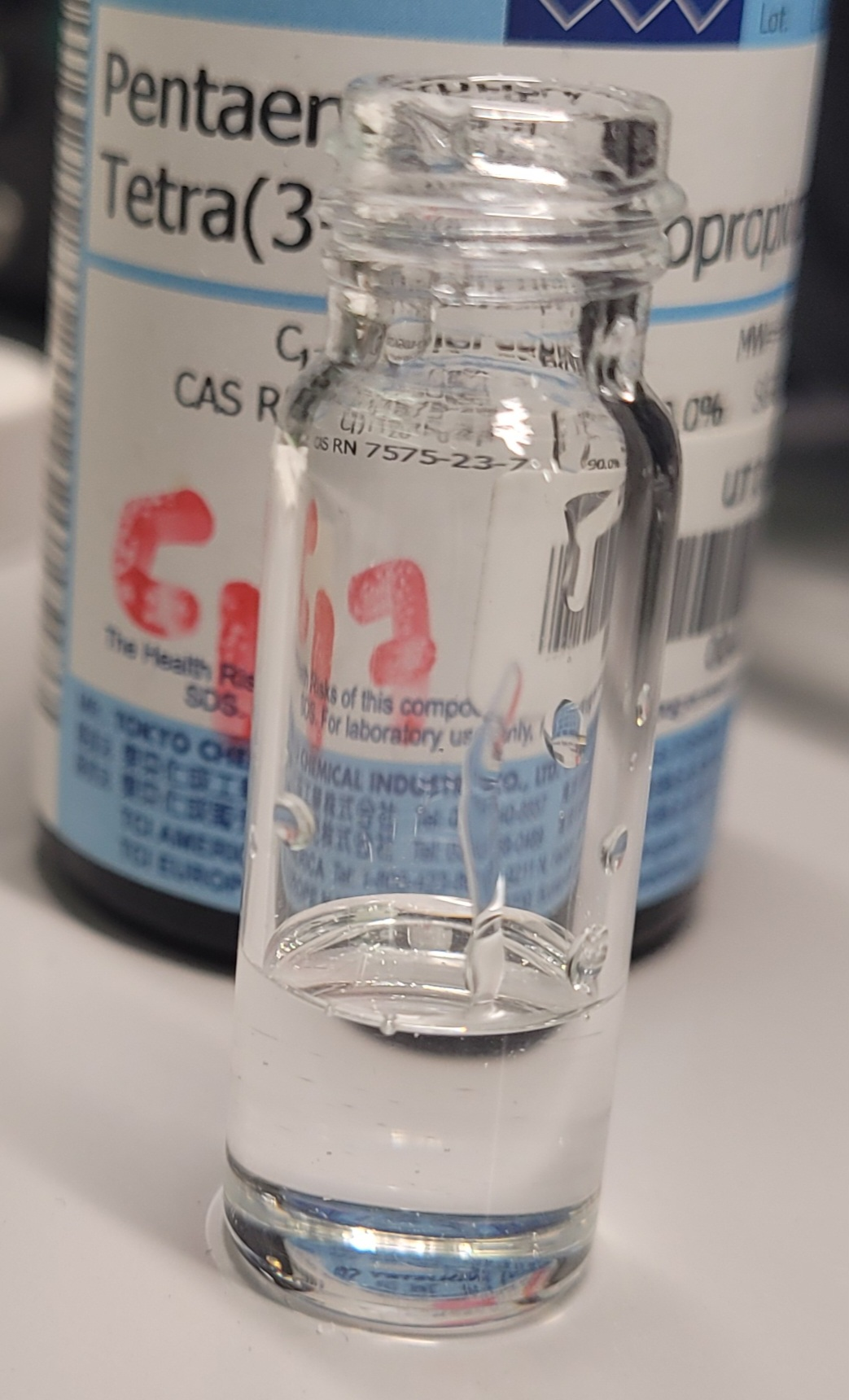

Names
- IUPAC name [3-(3-sulfanylpropanoyloxy)-2,2-bis(3-sulfanylpropanoyloxymethyl)propyl] 3-sulfanylpropanoate
- Other names Pentaerythritol tetrakis(3-mercaptopropionate); Pentaerythritol tetra(3-mercaptopropionate)

Identifiers
CAS Number	7575-23-7
3D model (JSmol)	Interactive image
ChEMBL	ChEMBLCHEMBL3183062
ChemSpider	74055
ECHA InfoCard	100.028.612
EC Number	231-472-8
PubChem CID	82056
UNII	6M5413VH6N
CompTox Dashboard (EPA)	DTXSID1044728
- InChI: InChI=1S/C17H28O8S4/c18-13(1-5-26)22-9-17(10-23-14(19)2-6-27,11-24-15(20)3-7-28)12-25-16(21)4-8-29/h26-29H,1-12H2 Key: JOBBTVPTPXRUBP-UHFFFAOYSA-N
- SMILES: C(CS)C(=O)OCC(COC(=O)CCS)(COC(=O)CCS)COC(=O)CCS

Properties
Chemical formula	C_{17}H_{28}O_{8}S_{4}
Molar mass	488.64 g·mol^{−1}
Appearance	colorless liquid
Boiling point	600.431 °C (1,112.776 °F; 873.581 K)
- Except where otherwise noted, data are given for materials in their standard state (at 25 °C [77 °F], 100 kPa). Infobox references

Pentaerythritol tetrakis(3-mercaptopropionate) is an organic compound which is derived from pentaerythritol fully esterified with four equivalents of 3-mercaptopropionic acid. It is a colorless liquid at room temperature.

== Uses ==
Pentaerythritol tetrakis(3-mercaptopropionate) is a common thiol monomer reacted with alkenes in the thiol-ene reaction to form polymeric networks. Being functionalized with four thiol groups, it can react with multifunctional alkenes to form thiol-ene networks.
