= Rio Hair Naturalizer System =

Hair relaxer brand

The Rio Hair Naturalizer System was a hair relaxer distributed by the World Rio Corporation Inc. It was available in two types; "Neutral", and one that claimed to have a "Color Enhancement Formula" that contained a black hair dye. As a product designed for home use, it was promoted through infomercials in the early to mid-1990s.

The U.S. Food and Drug Administration (FDA) and state government offices began receiving complaints about the Rio hair products in mid-1994. Many complainants said they had bought the hair relaxers by mail after viewing a 30-minute TV infomercial targeted to African Americans.

Some complainants reported that their hair began falling out immediately after applying the products, while others said they had problems after multiple applications. Some said they had seen doctors for treatment of scalp irritation. Many women said they had to cut their hair short to deal with bald spots.

== Timeline ==
November 6 and 8, 1994 FDA collected samples of the hair relaxers, at a Los Angeles-based affiliate, Pantron I Corp., of World Rio. Most of the products, which were imported from Brazil, were in the possession of Product Packaging West, also known as Pic 'N' Pac West, of North Hollywood, California.

November 23, 1994 the California Department of Health embargoed the products held in Los Angeles and North Hollywood, essentially blocking their sale in the United States.

December 21, 1994 FDA advised against use of the products after laboratory findings identified the low pH and the number of consumer complaints indicated that the hair relaxers were causing adverse reactions. About the same time, World Rio stated it would stop all sales of the products, but the FDA received reports from consumers that the company may still have been taking orders and billing customers through a mail-order company: Addressing and Mailing Inc., in North Las Vegas, Nevada.

January 23, 1995, at FDA's request, U.S. marshals seized the entire lot of products at Product Packaging West in California.

January 24, 1995 an investigator with FDA's San Francisco district office went to Addressing and Mailing to inspect the firm and found more than 8,000 cases of the Rio hair relaxers, worth about $500,000 in retail value. FDA notified the State of Nevada Division of Health, which, in turn, embargoed the products, thus preventing their sale.

June 14, 1995 World Rio voluntarily destroyed the 8,000 cases of Rio hair relaxers held at Addressing and Mailing in Nevada.

== Safety concerns ==
Despite the claims of the relaxer being safe and natural, the product contained copper, ammonium, and chloride salts and a pH of less than the listed level of 3. Due to these factors, people using the product suffered from hair loss, scalp burns, and (in some cases) green hair color. By 1995, there were over 3,000 complaints lodged with the Food and Drug Administration. Eventually, the product was barred from being imported into the U.S., and all remaining company stocks were destroyed. Several victims (about 53,000) filed a class action lawsuit against World Rio Corporation, resulting in a judgment of US$4.5 million. The incident also raised questions about the issue of relaxing afro-textured hair in general.

== See also ==
- Layered hair
