= Maritime pine bark extract =

Dietary Supplement

Clinical data
- Trade names: Pycnogenol
- Other names: French maritime pine bark extract

Identifiers
- UNII: 50JZ5Z98QY
- ChEMBL: ChEMBL2109208

Maritime pine bark extract is an extract from the bark of Pinus pinaster which is used as a dietary supplement. It is composed mostly of proanthocyanidins. Pycnogenol is a trademarked name for a standardized preparation that contains 70% procyanidins.

Meta analyses of the scientific studies of maritime pine bark extract have concluded that there is insufficient evidence to support its use for the treatment of any disease.

== History ==
Jack Masquelier is reported to have read the account of the explorer of Jacques Cartier's learning of the beneficial effects of a tea made from a tree bark by the Native Americans. And on the basis of this account looked to find the active ingredients. Various sources were looked into by Masquelier and he found a suitable source in, and extracted proanthocyanidins from, the bark of the European maritime pine. In 1979 Masquelier used the term Pycnogenol to refer to his product.

== Use ==
A 2012 Cochrane Review, updated in 2020, Robertson et al. reviewed the evidence on the efficacy of pine bark extract for treating a wide range of complaints (including asthma, children with ADHD, blood pressure, pain in CVI, reducing fasting blood glucose, osteoarthritis of the knee, cognitive failure in those with traumatic brain injury) and in all cases failed to find sufficient evidence to support the efficacy of the extract.
