= Allylglycine =

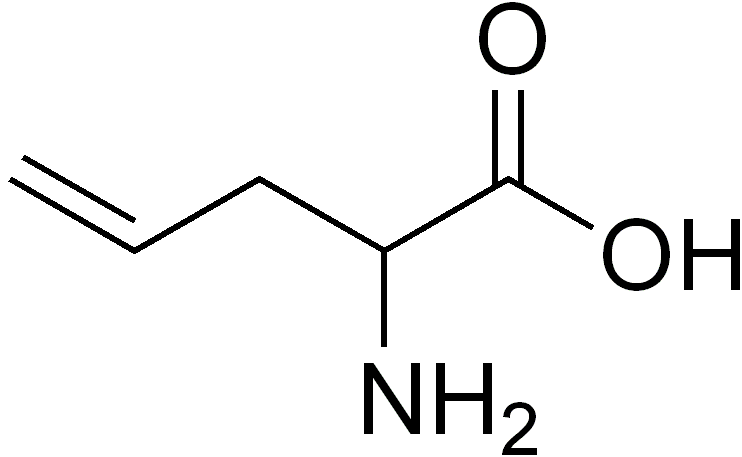

Names
- Preferred IUPAC name 2-Aminopent-4-enoic acid

Identifiers
CAS Number	7685-44-1
3D model (JSmol)	Interactive image; Interactive image
ChEBI	CHEBI:231976
ChemSpider	13425
ECHA InfoCard	100.028.809
PubChem CID	14044
CompTox Dashboard (EPA)	DTXSID701313217
- InChI: InChI=1S/C5H9NO2/c1-2-3-4(6)5(7)8/h2,4H,1,3,6H2,(H,7,8) Key: WNNNWFKQCKFSDK-UHFFFAOYSA-N; InChI=1/C5H9NO2/c1-2-3-4(6)5(7)8/h2,4H,1,3,6H2,(H,7,8) Key: WNNNWFKQCKFSDK-UHFFFAOYAL
- SMILES: C=CCC(C(=O)O)N; O=C(O)C(N)CC=C

Properties
Chemical formula	C_{5}H_{9}NO_{2}
Molar mass	115.13 g/mol
Appearance	white crystalline powder
Density	1.098 g/mL
Melting point	265 °C (509 °F; 538 K)
Boiling point	231 °C (448 °F; 504 K)

Hazards
- Occupational safety and health (OHS/OSH)
Main hazards	Convulsant
- Lethal dose or concentration (LD, LC)
LD_{50} (median dose)	147-195 mg/kg (mice, intraperitoneal)
- Except where otherwise noted, data are given for materials in their standard state (at 25 °C [77 °F], 100 kPa). verify (what is ?) Infobox references

Allylglycine is a glycine derivative. It is an inhibitor of glutamate decarboxylase. Inhibition of glutamate decarboxylase blocks GABA biosynthesis, leading to lower levels of the neurotransmitter. Allylglycine is known to induce seizures in animals studies, presumably due to this GDC-inhibiting activity.

== See also ==
- 3-Mercaptopropionic acid
