= Chemical depilatory =

Cosmetic preparation used to remove hair from the skin

A chemical depilatory is a cosmetic preparation used to remove hair from the skin. Common active ingredients are salts of thioglycolic acid and thiolactic acids. These compounds break the disulfide bonds in keratin and also hydrolyze the hair so that it is easily removed. Formerly, sulfides such as strontium sulfide were used, but due to their unpleasant odor, they have been replaced by thiols.

The main chemical reaction affected by the thioglycolate is:

2 HSCH_{2}CO_{2}H (thioglycolic acid) + R-S-S-R (cystine) → HO_{2}CCH_{2}-S-S-CH_{2}CO_{2}H (dithiodiglycolic acid) + 2 RSH (cysteine)

Chemical depilatories contain 5–6% calcium thioglycolate in a cream base (to avoid runoff). Calcium hydroxide or strontium hydroxide maintain a pH of about 12. Hair destruction requires about 10 minutes. Depilation is followed by careful rinsing with water, and various conditioners are applied to restore the skin's pH to normal. Depilation does not destroy the dermal papilla, and the hair grows back.

Chemical depilatories are available in gel, cream, lotion, aerosol, roll-on, and powder forms. Common brands include Nair, Magic Shave, and Veet.

Chemical depilatories are indicated in the treatment of hirsutism in polyendocrine metabolic ovarian syndrome.

Depilatory ointments, or plasters, were known to Greek and Roman authors as psilothrum. In Jewish lore, King Solomon is said to have discovered a chemical depilatory made from a mixture of lime and water and orpiment (arsenic trisulfide).
