= Mitami Shrine =

Shinto shrine in Osaka Prefecture, Japan

Mitami Shrine (美多彌神社)
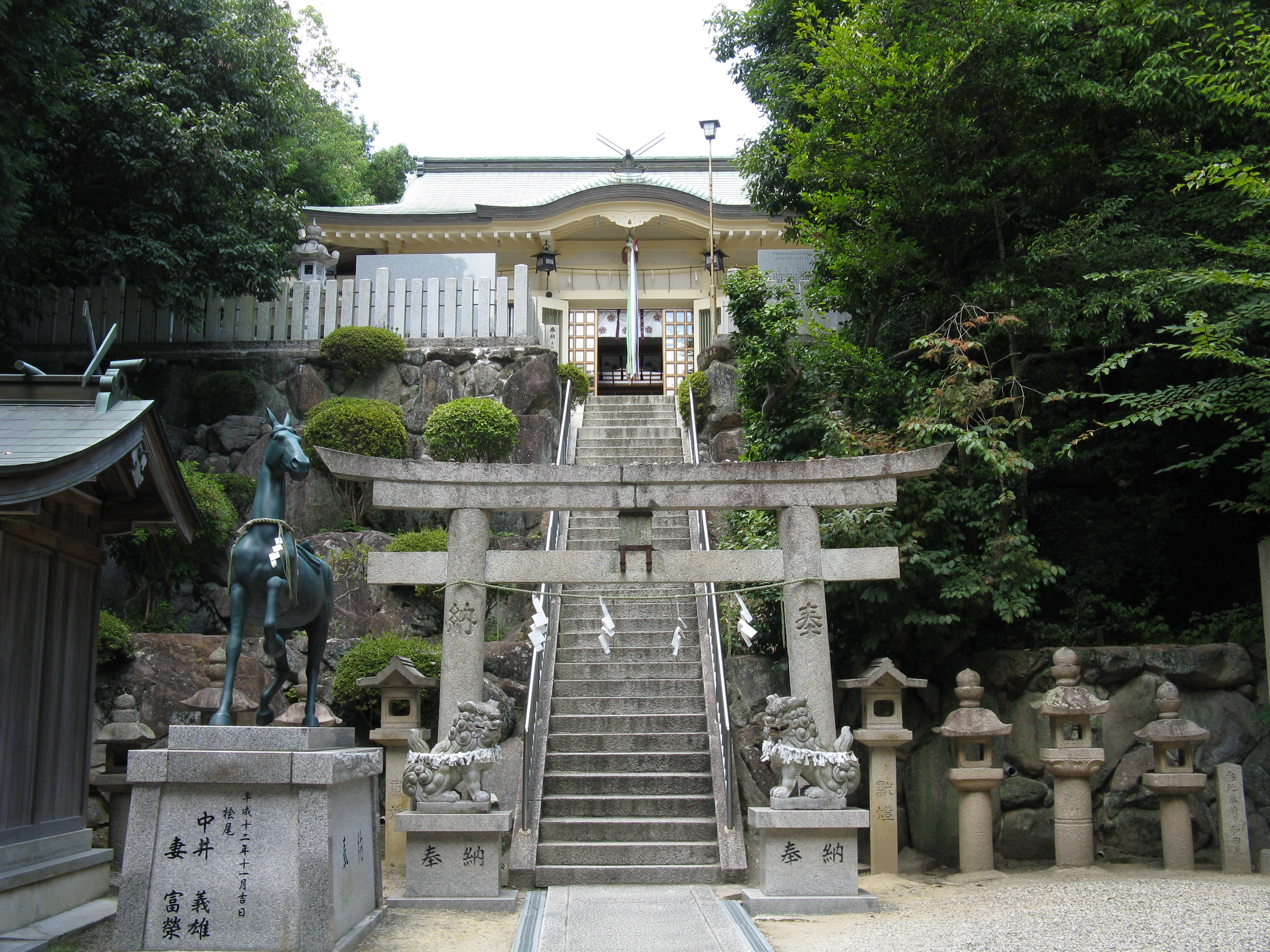
- Mitami shrine

- Location within Japan

Religion
- Affiliation: Shinto

Location
- Interactive map of Mitami Shrine (美多彌神社)
- Coordinates: 34°28′30″N 135°29′08″E

Mitami Shrine Mitami-jinja 美多彌神社 (also 美多弥神社) is a Shinto shrine in Sakai, Osaka Prefecture, Japan. It is located in Senboku New Town near Komyoike Station. It is accessible on the Nankai bus line or the Semboku Rapid Railway. Mitami-jinja is mentioned in the Heian period chronicle Engishiki compiled in the early tenth century. The shrine buildings were destroyed by Oda Nobunaga's troops in 1577, but they were rebuilt in 1592 by Wada Dosan 和田道讃.

Deities enshrined here include Ame-no-Koyane no mikoto (天児屋根命), Kumano no ookami (熊野大神), Itsukushima no ookami (厳島大神), Ookuninushi no mikoto (大国主命), Tenjin (Sugawara no Michizane, 菅原大神), Hachiman (八幡大神), Kotohira ookami (琴平大神), Susanoo no mikoto (素盞鳴男命) and Mikumari no kami (天水分大神).

The shrine is famous locally for its comparatively large population of Lithocarpus glaber (Shiribukagashi シリブカガシ).

== See also ==
- List of Shinto shrines
