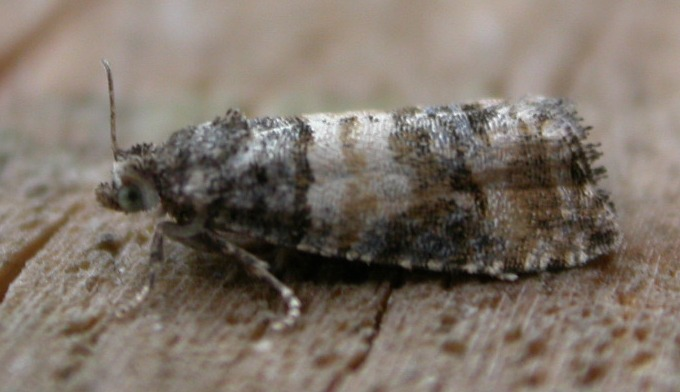
- Piniphila bifasciana

Scientific classification
- Domain: Eukaryota
- Kingdom: Animalia
- Phylum: Arthropoda
- Class: Insecta
- Order: Lepidoptera
- Family: Tortricidae
- Subfamily: Olethreutinae
- Genus: Piniphila; Falkovitsh, 1962

= Piniphila =

Genus of tortrix moths

Piniphila is a genus of moths belonging to the subfamily Olethreutinae of the family Tortricidae.

== Species ==
- Piniphila bifasciana (Haworth, [1811])

== See also ==
- List of Tortricidae genera
