= Magic Shave =

American brand of personal care products

- Type: Chemical depilatory, shaving powder, shaving cream, personal care products
- Manufacturer: SoftSheen-Carson
- Origin: United States
- Introduced: 1901; 125 years ago
- Variants: Fragrance, Sensitive Skin, Skin Conditioning
- Website: www.softsheen-carson.com/magic-shave

Magic Shave is an American brand of chemical depilatory shaving-related products and other personal care products. It was created by Loreal's skincare division, Softsheen and Carson, in order to reduce skin inflammation, irritation and razor bumps which commonly occurs among black and African-American men.

== Advertising ==
Beginning in May 2016, they began a "Team Up" with Marvel advertising their products with an advertisement comic starring Luke Cage in many issues, including the extremely popular Captain America: Steve Rogers #1.
