= 3-Mercaptopropionic acid =

Names
- Preferred IUPAC name 3-Sulfanylpropanoic acid
- Other names 3-MPA; 3-Mercaptopropanoic acid; β-Mercaptopropionic acid

Identifiers
CAS Number	107-96-0
3D model (JSmol)	Interactive image
Beilstein Reference	773807
ChEBI	CHEBI:44111
ChEMBL	ChEMBL358697
ChemSpider	6267
ECHA InfoCard	100.003.216
EC Number	203-537-0
Gmelin Reference	101294
PubChem CID	6514
UNII	B03TJ3QU9M
CompTox Dashboard (EPA)	DTXSID8026775
- InChI: InChI=1S/C3H6O2S/c4-3(5)1-2-6/h6H,1-2H2,(H,4,5) Key: DKIDEFUBRARXTE-UHFFFAOYSA-N
- SMILES: C(CS)C(=O)O

Properties
Chemical formula	C_{3}H_{6}O_{2}S
Molar mass	106.14 g·mol^{−1}
Density	1.218
Melting point	16.9 °C (62.4 °F; 290.0 K)
Boiling point	111 °C (232 °F; 384 K) at 15 mmHg
Solubility in water	soluble
Solubility	ether benzene alcohol water
Acidity (pK_{a})	4.34
Refractive index (n_{D})	1.4911 at 21 °C

Hazards
- GHS labelling
Pictograms	(GHS05: Corrosive) (GHS06: Toxic) (GHS07: Exclamation mark)
Signal word	Danger
Hazard statements	H290, H301, H314, H332
Precautionary statements	P234, P260, P264, P270, P271, P280, P301+P310, P301+P330+P331, P303+P361+P353, P304+P312, P304+P340, P305+P351+P338, P310, P312, P321, P330, P363, P390, P404, P405, P501
- Except where otherwise noted, data are given for materials in their standard state (at 25 °C [77 °F], 100 kPa). Infobox references

3-Mercaptopropionic acid (3-MPA) is an organosulfur compound with the formula HSCH_{2}CH_{2}CO_{2}H. It is a bifunctional molecule, containing both carboxylic acid and thiol groups. It is a colorless oil. It is derived from the addition of hydrogen sulfide to acrylic acid.

== Reactions and uses ==
It is competitive inhibitor of glutamate decarboxylase, and therefore acts as a convulsant. It has higher potency and faster onset of action compared to allylglycine.

It is used to prepare hydrophilic gold nanoparticles, exploiting the affinity of gold for sulfur ligands.

It is esterified with polyols to form thiol-based polymer cross-linking agents such as pentaerythritol-based pentaerythritol tetrakis(3-mercaptopropionate).

== See also ==
- Allylglycine
- Thiolactic acid (2-mercaptopropionic acid)
