= Thiolysis =

Thiolysis is a reaction with a thiol (R-SH) that cleaves one compound into two. Thiolysis involves the addition of coenzyme A to one of the products. This reaction is similar to hydrolysis, which involves water instead of a thiol. This reaction is seen in β-oxidation of fatty acids. The depolymerisation of condensed tannins with the use of benzyl mercaptan as nucleophile is also called thiolysis.

Example of thiolysis (thiol: CoA-SH)
