= Açaí oil =

Oil used in foods and cosmetics

Açaí oil is obtained from the fruit of Euterpe oleracea (açaí palm), which grows in the Amazon rainforest. The oil is rich in phenolic compounds similar in profile to the pulp itself, such as vanillic acid, syringic acid, p-hydroxybenzoic acid, protocatechuic acid and ferulic acid as well as (+)-catechin and numerous procyanidin oligomers.

Açai oil is green in color and has a bland aroma. It is high in oleic and palmitic fatty acids (table).

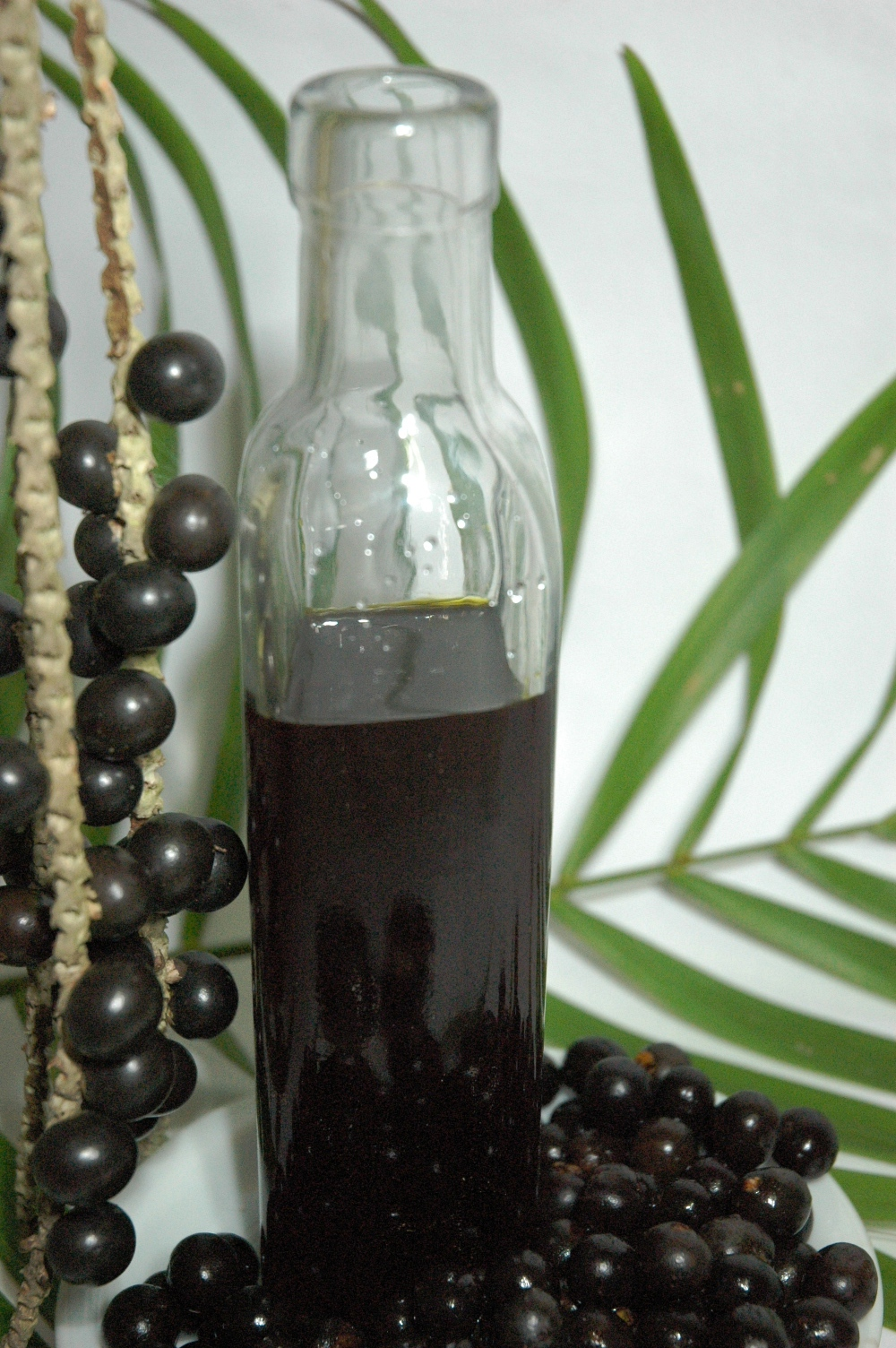
Açai oil

== Uses ==
Açai oil is widely used for cooking and as a salad dressing. In cosmetics, it is used in shampoos, soaps and skin moisturizers.

Fatty acid	Percentage
Palmitic	22.0%
Stearic	2.0%
Arachidic	2.5%
Palmitoleic	2.0%
Oleic	60.0%
Linoleic	12.0%

== See also ==
- Açaí palm
