= Vanillin–HCl staining =

Vanillin–HCl staining (10% vanillin and 90% of a mixture of ethanol and HCl, giving an orange color) can be used to visualize the localisation of tannins in cells.

The localization of phlorotannins can be investigated by light microscopy after vanillin–HCl staining. The phlorotannins can be seen this way in physodes in brown algae.

The vanillin-HCl method can be used to estimate the proanthocyanidins content in plant cells, resulting in a red color of the test in the presence of catechin or proanthocyanidins.
