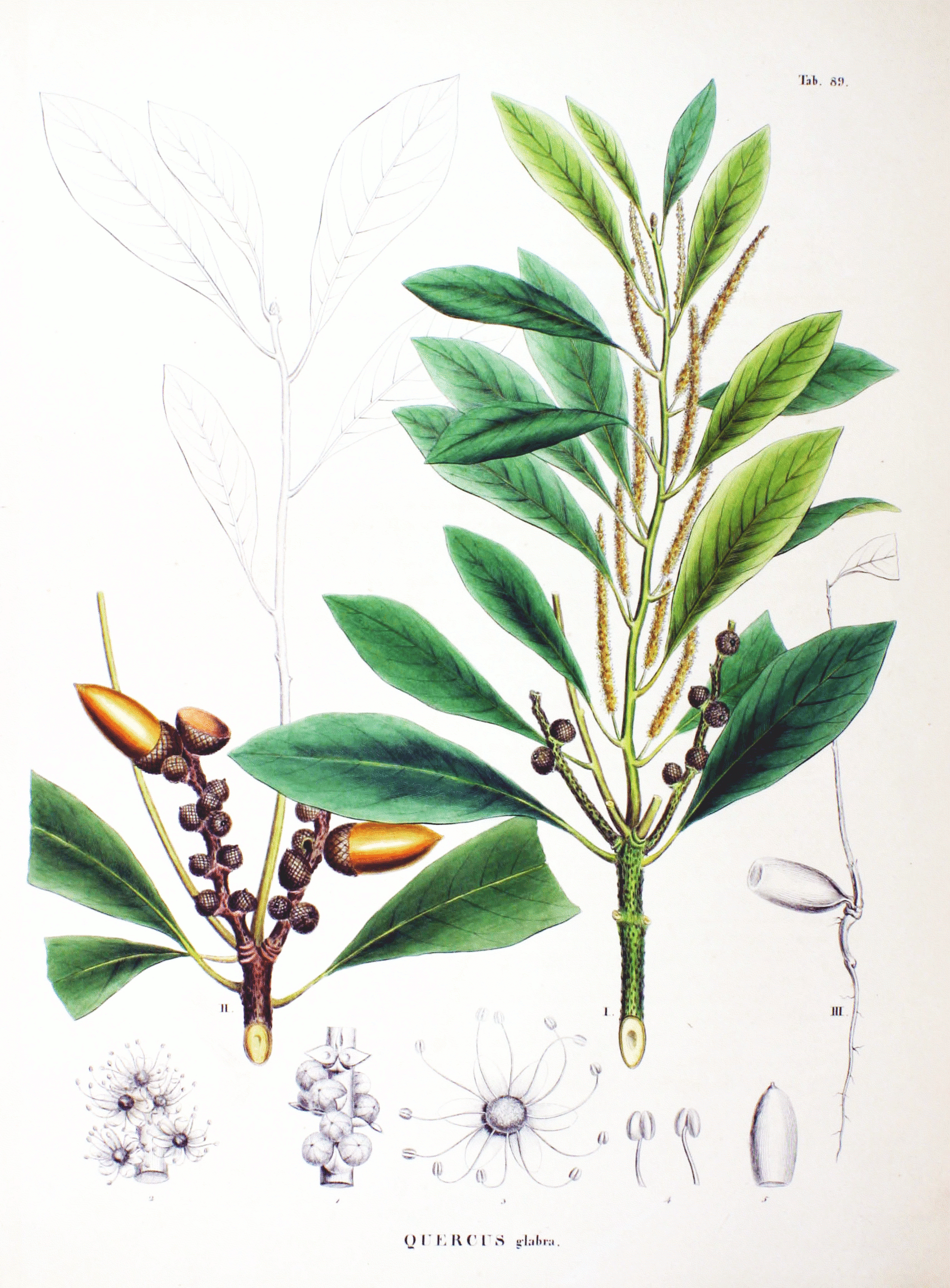
- Lithocarpus glaber illustration in Flora Japonica, Sectio Prima (Tafelband)

Conservation status
- Least Concern (IUCN 3.1)

Scientific classification
- Kingdom: Plantae
- Clade: Tracheophytes
- Clade: Angiosperms
- Clade: Eudicots
- Clade: Rosids
- Order: Fagales
- Family: Fagaceae
- Genus: Lithocarpus
- Species: L. glaber

Binomial name
- Lithocarpus glaber (Thunb.) Nakai

Synonyms
- Kuromatea glabra (Thunb.) Kudô; Lithocarpus inversus (Lindl. & Paxton) Nakai; Lithocarpus thalassicus (Hance) Rehder; Pasania glabra (Thunb.) Oerst.; Pasania glabra f. microphylla Hayashi; Pasania sieboldiana (Blume) Nakai; Pasania thalassica (Hance) Oerst.; Quercus acuta Siebold ex Blume; Quercus glabra Thunb. (1784); Quercus glabra Bürger ex Blume (1851), nom. illeg. homonym. post.; Quercus inversa Lindl. & Paxton; Quercus reversa Benth.; Quercus sieboldiana Blume; Quercus thalassica Hance; Quercus thalassica var. obtusiglans Dunn; Synaedrys glabra (Thunb.) Koidz.; Synaedrys thalassica (Hance) Koidz.

= Lithocarpus glaber =

Species of tree

Lithocarpus glaber, the Japanese oak, is a tree species in the family Fagaceae found in central and southern Japan, southern China, and Taiwan. Mitami Shrine, a Shinto shrine in Sakai, Osaka Prefecture, Japan, is famous locally for its comparatively large population of Lithocarpus glaber, known as Shiribukagashi (尻深樫 シリブカガシ). In China, it is called ke (柯). In Cantonese, it is called Seklik (石櫟).

Condensed tannins from L. glaber leaves have been analysed through acid-catalyzed degradation in the presence of cysteamine and have a potent free radical scavenging activity.

The species was first described as Quercus glabra by Carl Peter Thunberg in 1784. In 1916 Takenoshin Nakai placed the species in genus Lithocarpus as L. glaber.

== See also ==
- Quercus crispula - Japanese oak - 水楢
