= Ammonium thioglycolate =

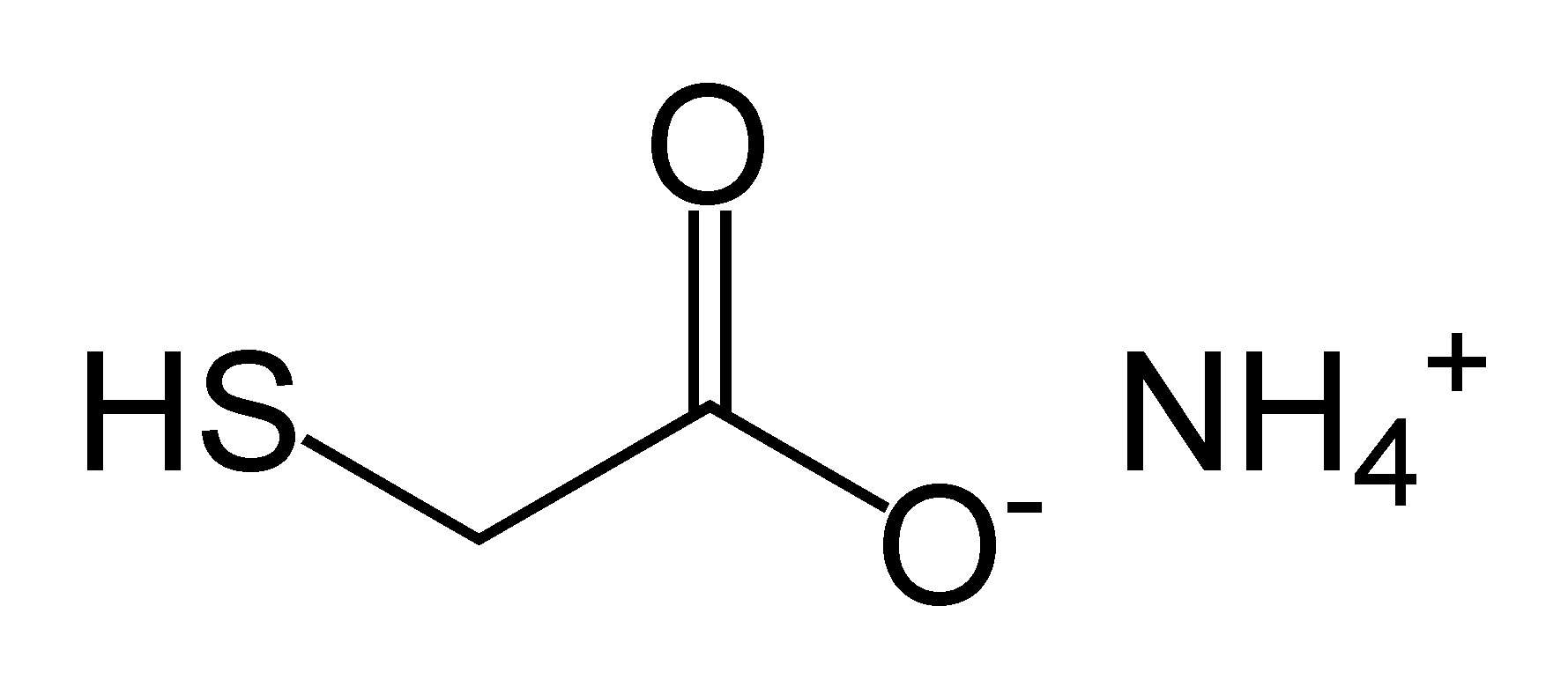
- Ammonium thioglycolate

Names
- Other names Perm salt

Identifiers
CAS Number	5421-46-5
3D model (JSmol)	Interactive image
ChemSpider	20239
ECHA InfoCard	100.024.128
PubChem CID	21534
UNII	6P9E788VZZ
CompTox Dashboard (EPA)	DTXSID2027599
- InChI: InChI=1S/C2H4O2S.H3N/c3-2(4)1-5;/h5H,1H2,(H,3,4);1H3 Key: ZZTCCAPMZLDHFM-UHFFFAOYSA-N; InChI=1/C2H4O2S.H3N/c3-2(4)1-5;/h5H,1H2,(H,3,4);1H3 Key: ZZTCCAPMZLDHFM-UHFFFAOYAY
- SMILES: [O-]C(=O)CS.[NH4+]

Properties
Chemical formula	C_{2}H_{7}NO_{2}S
Molar mass	109.15 g/mol
- Except where otherwise noted, data are given for materials in their standard state (at 25 °C [77 °F], 100 kPa). verify (what is ?) Infobox references

Ammonium thioglycolate, also known as perm salt, is the salt of thioglycolic acid and ammonia. It has the formula HSCH_{2}CO_{2}NH_{4} and has use in perming hair.

== Chemistry ==
Being the salt of a weak acid and weak base, ammonium thioglycolate exists in solution as an equilibrium mixture of the salt itself as well as thioglycolic acid and ammonia:

HSCH_{2}COO^{−} + NH^{+}_{4} ⇌ HSCH_{2}COOH + NH_{3}

Thioglycolate, in turn, is able to cleave disulfide bonds, capping one side with a hydrogen and forming a new disulfide with the other side:

RSH + R′SSR′ ⇌ R′SH + RSSR′

=== Use in perms ===
A solution containing ammonium thioglycolate contains a lot of free ammonia, which swells hair, rendering it permeable. The thioglycolic acid in the perm solution reduces the disulfide cystine bonds in the cortex of the hair. In a sense, the thioglycolate removes crosslinks. After washing, the hair is treated with a mild solution of hydrogen peroxide, which oxidizes the cysteines back to cystine. These new chemical bonds impart the structural rigidity necessary for a successful perm. The rigidification process is akin to the vulcanization of rubber, where commonly polysulfide linkages are used to crosslink the polymer chains. However, not as many disulfide bonds are reformed as there were before the permanent. As a result, the hair is weaker than before the permanent was applied and repeated applications over the same spot may eventually cause strand breakage.

Since polar molecules are less volatile than nonpolar ones, the glycolate substituent makes the thiol non-volatile and hence less odorous. An added advantage is that the glycolate confers some solubility in water. One could almost certainly use HSCH_{3} and ammonia to give a perm, but there would be serious olfactory consequences.

== In popular culture ==
In the 2001 film Legally Blonde, the protagonist, law student Elle Woods, wins her first case by proving that a witness who had gotten a perm the day of a murder could not have been in the shower at the time of the murder because "isn't the first cardinal rule of perm maintenance that you're forbidden to wet your hair for at least 24 hours after getting a perm at the risk of deactivating the ammonium thioglycolate?" (but mispronouncing it as "ammonium thyglockalate").
