= Thiolactic acid =

Names
- Preferred IUPAC name 2-Sulfanylpropanoic acid
- Other names 2-Mercaptopropanoic acid

Identifiers
CAS Number	79-42-5
3D model (JSmol)	Interactive image
ChEBI	CHEBI:47872
ChemSpider	56121
ECHA InfoCard	100.001.097
EC Number	201-206-5
PubChem CID	62326
UNII	O5U6967KGF
CompTox Dashboard (EPA)	DTXSID80861636
- InChI: InChI=1S/C3H6O2S/c1-2(6)3(4)5/h2,6H,1H3,(H,4,5) Key: PMNLUUOXGOOLSP-UHFFFAOYSA-N
- SMILES: SC(C)C(O)=O

Properties
Chemical formula	C_{3}H_{6}O_{2}S
Molar mass	106.14 g·mol^{−1}
Appearance	Colorless oil
Density	1.22 g/cm^{3}
Melting point	10 °C (50 °F; 283 K)

Related compounds
Related compounds	Lactic acid; Thioglycolic acid; Hydroxybutyric acid; 3-Mercaptopropionic acid; Thiocarbonic acid
- Except where otherwise noted, data are given for materials in their standard state (at 25 °C [77 °F], 100 kPa). verify (what is ?) Infobox references

Thiolactic acid is the organosulfur compound with the formula CH_{3}CH(SH)CO_{2}H. The molecule contains both carboxyl and thiol functional groups, −C(=O)−OH and −SH respectively. It is structurally related to lactic acid by the interchange of −SH for −OH. It is a colorless oil.

Thiolactic acid was once widely used in hair permanent waving formulations, but has been displaced by formulations based on thioglycolic acid. Instead of using the acid itself, its salts (2-sulfanylpropanoates) are used. It is now mainly used for depilation.
