= Thioglycolic acid =

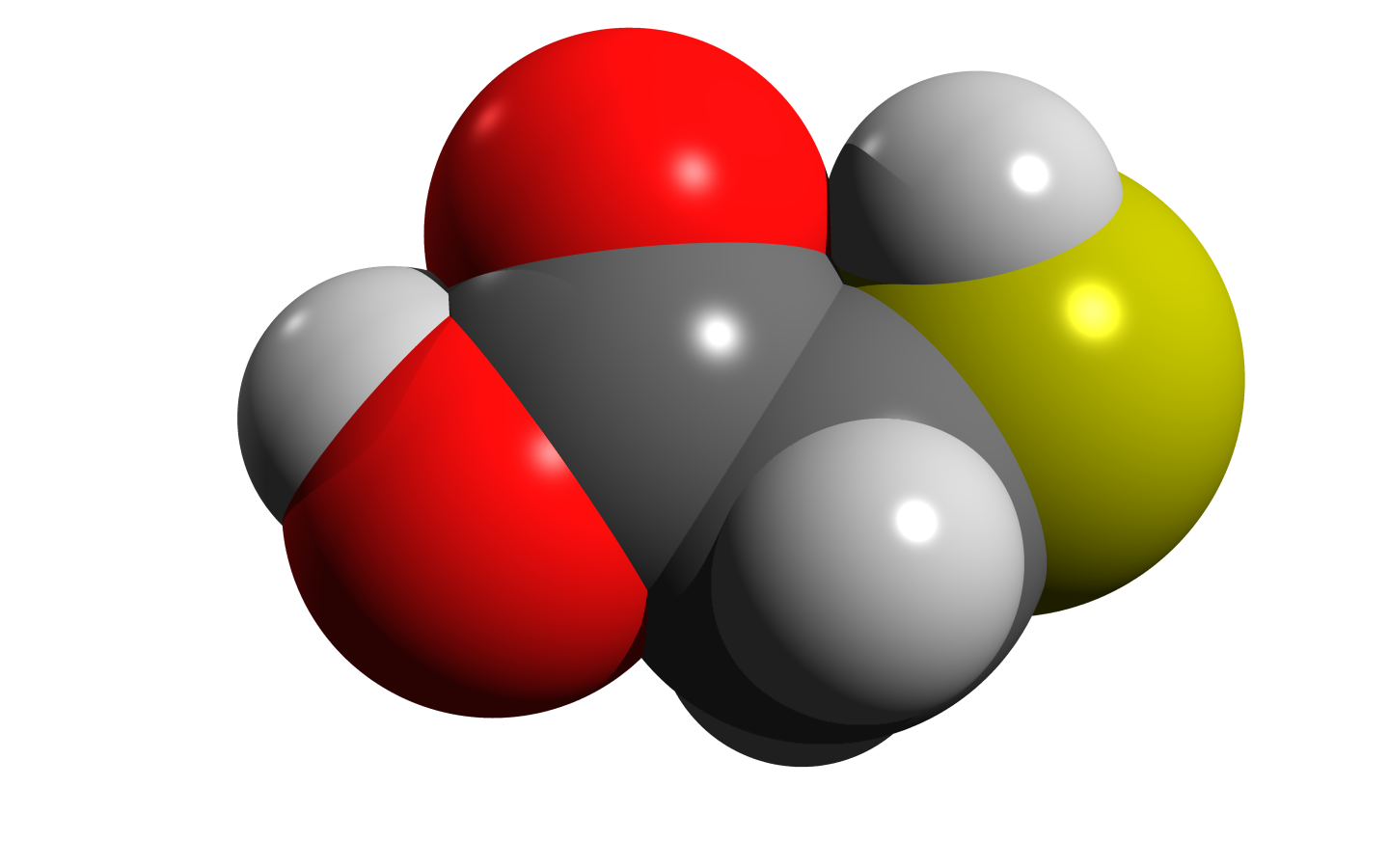
- Space-filling model of thioglycolic acid

Names
- Preferred IUPAC name Sulfanylacetic acid
- Other names 2-Sulfanylacetic acid 2-Mercaptoacetic acid Acetyl mercaptan Mercaptoacetate; Mercaptoacetic acid Thioglycolic acid Thiovanic acid

Identifiers
CAS Number	68-11-1
3D model (JSmol)	Interactive image
Beilstein Reference	506166
ChEBI	CHEBI:30065
ChEMBL	ChEMBL116455
ChemSpider	1101
DrugBank	DB15429
ECHA InfoCard	100.000.616
EC Number	200-677-4
Gmelin Reference	101048
KEGG	C02086
PubChem CID	1133
RTECS number	AI5950000
UNII	7857H94KHM
CompTox Dashboard (EPA)	DTXSID8026141
- InChI: InChI=1S/C2H4O2S/c3-2(4)1-5/h5H,1H2,(H,3,4) Key: CWERGRDVMFNCDR-UHFFFAOYSA-N; InChI=1/C2H4O2S/c3-2(4)1-5/h5H,1H2,(H,3,4) Key: CWERGRDVMFNCDR-UHFFFAOYAP
- SMILES: C(C(=O)O)S

Properties
Chemical formula	C_{2}H_{4}O_{2}S
Molar mass	92.11 g·mol^{−1}
Appearance	colorless, clear liquid
Odor	strong, disagreeable
Density	1.32 g/cm^{3}
Melting point	−16 °C (3 °F; 257 K)
Boiling point	96 °C (205 °F; 369 K) at 5 mmHg
Solubility in water	miscible
Vapor pressure	10 mmHg (17.8 °C)
Magnetic susceptibility (χ)	−50.0·10^{−6} cm^{3}/mol

Hazards
- GHS labelling
Pictograms	(GHS05: Corrosive) (GHS06: Toxic)
Hazard statements	H301+H311+H331, H314
Precautionary statements	P260, P262, P264, P264+P265, P270, P271, P272, P280, P284, P301+P316, P301+P330+P331, P302+P352, P302+P361+P354, P304+P340, P305+P354+P338, P316, P317, P320, P321, P330, P333+P317, P361+P364, P362+P364, P363, P403+P233, P405, P501
Flash point	> 110 °C; 230 °F; 383 K
Explosive limits	5.9%
- NIOSH (US health exposure limits)
PEL (Permissible)	none
REL (Recommended)	TWA 1 ppm (4 mg/m^{3}) [skin]
IDLH (Immediate danger)	N.D.
- Except where otherwise noted, data are given for materials in their standard state (at 25 °C [77 °F], 100 kPa). verify (what is ?) Infobox references

Thioglycolic acid (TGA) is the organic compound HSCH_{2}CO_{2}H. TGA is often called mercaptoacetic acid (MAA). It contains both a thiol (mercaptan) and carboxylic acid functional groups. It is a colorless liquid with a strongly unpleasant odor. TGA is miscible with polar organic solvents.

== Uses ==
TGA is used as a chemical depilatory and is still used as such, especially in salt forms, including calcium thioglycolate and sodium thioglycolate. TGA is the precursor to ammonium thioglycolate, which is used for permanents. TGA and its derivatives break the disulfide bonds in the cortex of hair. One reforms these broken bonds in giving hair a "perm". Alternatively and more commonly, the process leads to depilation, as is done commonly in leather processing. It is also used as an acidity indicator, manufacturing of thioglycolates, and in bacteriology for preparation of thioglycolate media. Thioglycolysis reactions are used on condensed tannins to study their structure.

TGA has also been used to soften nails, either to reshape pincer nails into the correct position or to help the topical antifungal agent terbinafine penetrate the nail.

Organotin derivatives of thioglycolic acid isooctyl esters are widely used as stabilizers for PVC. These species have the formula R_{2}Sn(SCH_{2}CO_{2}C_{8}H_{17})_{2}.

Sodium thioglycolate is a component of thioglycolate broth, a special bacterial growth media. It is also used in so-called "fallout remover" or "wheel cleaner" to remove iron oxide residue from wheels. Ferrous iron combines with thioglycolate to form red-violet ferric thioglycolate.

== Production ==
Thioglycolic acid is prepared by reaction of sodium or potassium chloroacetate with alkali metal hydrosulfide in aqueous medium. It can be also prepared via the Bunte salt obtained by reaction of sodium thiosulfate with chloroacetic acid:

ClCH_{2}CO_{2}H + Na_{2}S_{2}O_{3} → Na[O_{3}S_{2}CH_{2}CO_{2}H] + NaCl
Na[O_{3}S_{2}CH_{2}CO_{2}H] + H_{2}O → HSCH_{2}CO_{2}H + NaHSO_{4}

== Reactions ==
Thioglycolic acid with a pK_{a} of 3.83 is an acid about 8.5 times stronger than acetic acid (pK_{a} 4.76):

HSCH_{2}CO_{2}H → HSCH_{2}CO_{2}^{−} + H^{+}

The second ionization has a pK_{a} of 9.3:

HSCH_{2}CO_{2}^{−} → ^{−}SCH_{2}CO_{2}^{−} + H^{+}

Thioglycolic acid is a reducing agent, especially at higher pH. It oxidizes to the corresponding disulfide (2-[(carboxymethyl)disulfanyl]acetic acid or dithiodiglycolic acid):

2 HSCH_{2}CO_{2}H + "O" → [SCH_{2}CO_{2}H]_{2} + H_{2}O

=== With metal ions ===
Thioglycolic acid, usually as its dianion, forms complexes with metal ions. Such complexes have been used for the detection of iron, molybdenum, silver, and tin. Thioglycolic acid reacts with diethyl acetylmalonate to form acetylmercaptoacetic acid and diethyl malonate, the reducing agent in the conversion of Fe(III) to Fe(II).

== History ==
Scientist David R. Goddard, in the early 1930s, identified TGA as a useful reagent for reducing the disulfide bonds in proteins, including keratin (hair protein), while studying why protease enzymes could not easily digest hair, nails, feathers, and such. He realized that while the disulfide bonds, which stabilize proteins by cross-linking, were broken, the structures containing these proteins could be reshaped easily, and that they would retain this shape after the disulfide bonds were allowed to re-form. TGA was developed in the 1940s for use as a chemical depilatory.

== Safety and detection ==
The LD_{50} (oral, rat) is 261 mg/kg, LC_{50} inhalation for rat is 21 mg/m^{3} for 4 h, and LD_{50} dermal for rabbit is 848 mg/kg. Mercaptoacetic acid in hair waving and depilatory products containing other mercapto acids can be identified by using thin-layer chromatography and gas chromatography. MAA also has been identified by using potentiometric titration with silver nitrate solution.

== See also ==
- Ammonium thioglycolate
- Glycolic acid
- Thiolactic acid
- Dithiothreitol
