= P-Dimethylaminocinnamaldehyde =

p-Dimethylaminocinnamaldehyde

Names
- IUPAC name 3-[4-(Dimethylamino)phenyl]prop-2-enal
- Other names DMAC; 4-Dimethylaminocinnamaldehyde

Identifiers
| CAS Number | 20432-35-3 |
| 3D model (JSmol) | Interactive image |
| Abbreviations | DMACA |
| Beilstein Reference | 972369 |
| ChemSpider | 4447567 (E); 23646677 (Z); 83262 |
| EC Number | 228-267-0 |
| MeSH | 4-Dimethylaminocinnamaldehyde |
| PubChem CID | 5284506 (E); 25310830 (Z); 92224 |
| UNII | 9RSI7WZ9F0 |
| CompTox Dashboard (EPA) | DTXSID9022237 |
- InChI: InChI=1S/C11H13NO/c1-12(2)11-7-5-10(6-8-11)4-3-9-13/h3-9H,1-2H3/b4-3+ Key: RUKJCCIJLIMGEP-ONEGZZNKSA-N; InChI=1/C11H13NO/c1-12(2)11-7-5-10(6-8-11)4-3-9-13/h3-9H,1-2H3/b4-3+ Key: RUKJCCIJLIMGEP-ONEGZZNKBZ
- SMILES: [H]C(=O)C=CC1=CC=C(C=C1)N(C)C

Properties
| Chemical formula | C_{11}H_{13}NO |
| Molar mass | 175.22 g/mol |
| Appearance | white to light yellow crystal powder |
| Density | 1.057 g/mL |
| Melting point | 138 °C (280 °F; 411 K) |
| Boiling point | 329 °C (624 °F; 602 K) |
| Solubility in dioxane | 50 g/L |
- Except where otherwise noted, data are given for materials in their standard state (at 25 °C [77 °F], 100 kPa). Infobox references

p-Dimethylaminocinnamaldehyde (DMACA) is an aromatic hydrocarbon. It is used in an acidic solution to detect indoles.

== Use as a testing reagent ==
The DMACA is any of a number of acidified DMACA solutions:

- 0.117 g of DMACA, 39 mL of ethanol, 5 mL of conc hydrochloric acid and diluted to 50mL with water
- 1 g DMACA, 1 mL conc. hydrochloric acid and 99 mL water
- 1 g DMACA in 99 mL conc. hydrochloric acid.

It is primarily used as a histological dye used to detect indoles, particularly for production in cells. It is used for the rapid identification of bacteria containing tryptophanase enzyme systems. It is also particularly useful for localization of proanthocyanidins compounds in plants, resulting in a blue staining. It has been used for grapevine fruit or for legumes foliage histology.

A colorimetric assay based upon the reaction of A-rings with the chromogen. p-Dimethylaminocinnamaldehyde has been developed for flavanoids in beer that can be compared with the vanillin procedure. The DMACA reagent may be superior to the vanillin procedure for the detection of catechins.

The DMACA reagent changes color over several days when exposed to air but when refrigerated can be stored for up to two weeks.

The DMACA reagent may also be referred to as the Renz and Loew reagent.

== See also ==
- Ehrlich's reagent, a simple spot-test to presumptively identify alkaloids
