= Benzyl mercaptan =

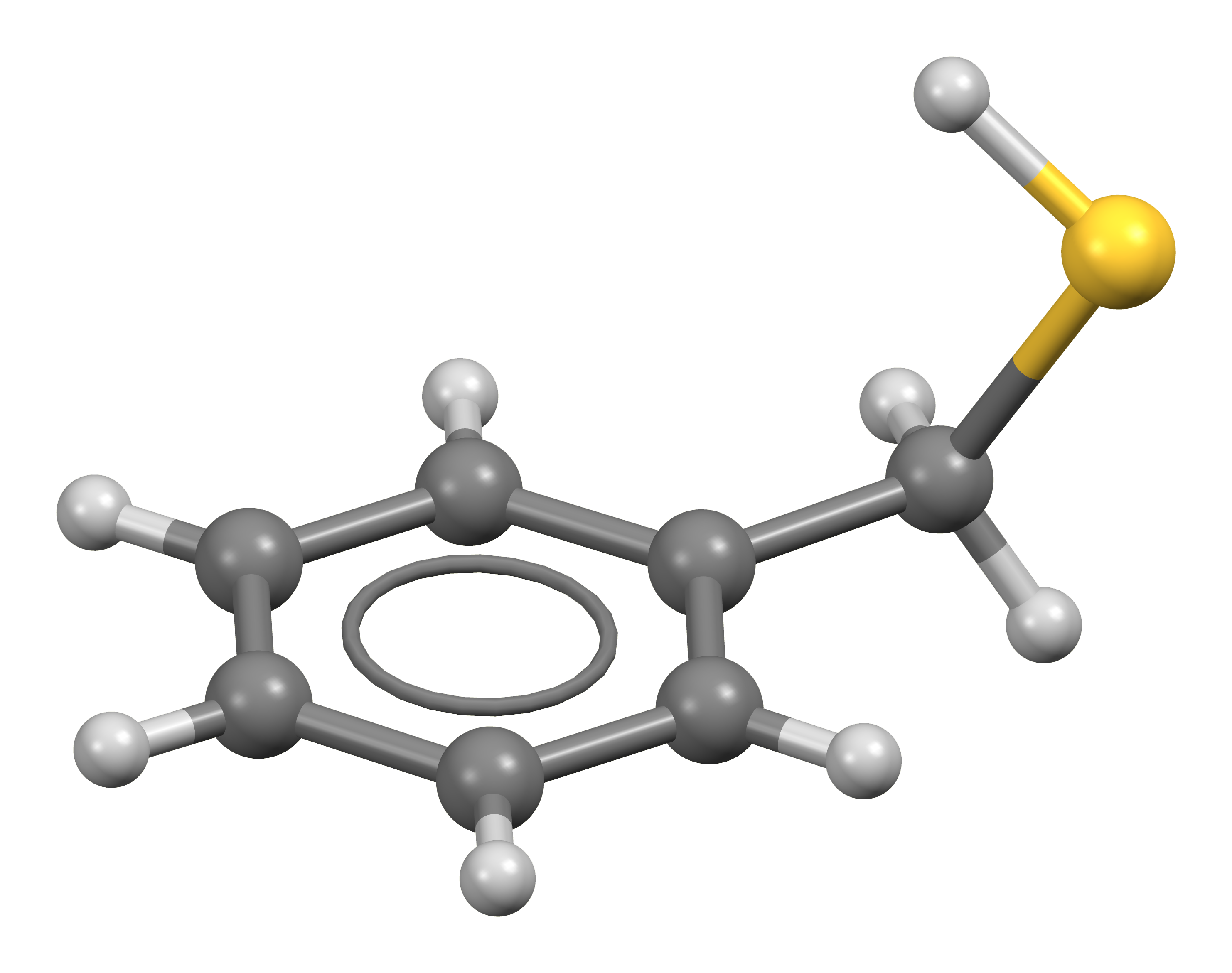

Names
- Preferred IUPAC name Phenylmethanethiol
- Other names alpha-Toluenethiol; Benzylthiol; Thiobenzyl alcohol Benzyl mercaptan alpha-Toluolthiol; Benzylhydrosulfide; Benzyl hydrosulfide

Identifiers
CAS Number	100-53-8
3D model (JSmol)	Interactive image
Abbreviations	BnSH; PhCH_{2}SH
ChEBI	CHEBI:137674
ChEMBL	ChEMBL1224557
ChemSpider	13851383
ECHA InfoCard	100.002.602
PubChem CID	7509
UNII	OS34A21OBZ
CompTox Dashboard (EPA)	DTXSID6026664
- InChI: InChI=1S/C7H8S/c8-6-7-4-2-1-3-5-7/h1-5,8H,6H2 Key: UENWRTRMUIOCKN-UHFFFAOYSA-N; InChI=1/C7H8S/c8-6-7-4-2-1-3-5-7/h1-5,8H,6H2 Key: UENWRTRMUIOCKN-UHFFFAOYAC
- SMILES: SCc1ccccc1

Properties
Chemical formula	C_{7}H_{8}S
Molar mass	124.20 g·mol^{−1}
Appearance	colourless liquid
Odor	Unpleasant leek or garlic-like
Density	1.058 g/mL
Melting point	−30 °C (−22 °F; 243 K)
Boiling point	195 °C (383 °F; 468 K)
Solubility in water	low
Solubility	very soluble in ethanol, ether soluble in CS_{2} slightly soluble in CCl_{4}
Acidity (pK_{a})	9.43 (H_{2}O)
Refractive index (n_{D})	1.5751 (20 °C)

Hazards
- GHS labelling
Pictograms	(GHS07: Exclamation mark)
Signal word	Warning
Hazard statements	H302, H319
Precautionary statements	P264, P264+P265, P270, P280, P301+P317, P305+P351+P338, P330, P337+P317, P501
NFPA 704 (fire diamond)	2 2 0
Flash point	70 °C (158 °F; 343 K)
- Lethal dose or concentration (LD, LC)
LD_{50} (median dose)	493 mg/kg (rat, oral)
- Except where otherwise noted, data are given for materials in their standard state (at 25 °C [77 °F], 100 kPa). verify (what is ?) Infobox references

Benzyl mercaptan is an organosulfur compound with the formula C_{7}H_{8}S or C_{6}H_{5}CH_{2}SH. It is a common laboratory alkylthiol that occurs in trace amounts naturally. It is a colorless, malodorous liquid.

== Preparation and occurrence ==
Benzyl mercaptan can be prepared by the reaction of benzyl chloride and thiourea. The initially formed isothiouronium salt must be subjected to alkaline hydrolysis to obtain the thiol.

It has been identified in boxwood (Buxus sempervirens L.) and is known to contribute to the smoky aroma of certain wines. It also occurs naturally in coffee.

== Use in organic synthesis ==
Benzyl mercaptan is used for S-alkylation to give benzylthioethers.

It has been used as a source of the thiol functional group in organic synthesis. Debenzylation can be effected by dissolving metal reduction:

RSCH_{2}C_{6}H_{5} + 2 H^{+} + 2 e^{−} → RSH + CH_{3}C_{6}H_{5}

Condensed tannins undergo acid-catalyzed cleavage in the presence of benzyl mercaptan.

== Related derivatives ==
Methoxy-substituted benzyl mercaptans have been developed that cleave easily, are recyclable, and are odorless.
