= C30H26O12 =

The molecular formula C_{30}H_{26}O_{12} may refer to:

Several B type proanthocyanidins dimers:

- Procyanidin B1 or epicatechin-(4β→8)-catechin
- Procyanidin B2 or (-)-epicatechin-(4β→8)-(-)-epicatechin
- Procyanidin B3 or catechin-(4β→8)-catechin
- Procyanidin B4 or catechin-(4α→8)-epicatechin
- Procyanidin B5 or epicatechin-(4β→6)-epicatechin
- Procyanidin B6 or catechin-(4α→6)-catechin
- Procyanidin B8 catechin-(4α→6)-epicatechin
