= B type proanthocyanidin =

Specific type of flavanoids

B type proanthocyanidins are a specific type of proanthocyanidin, which are a class of flavanoids. They are oligomers of flavan-3-ols.

== Dimeric B type proanthocyanidins ==
These molecules have the molecular formula C_{30}H_{26}O_{12} (molar mass : 578.52 g/mol, exact mass : 578.142426).

=== Molecules with 4→8 bonds ===
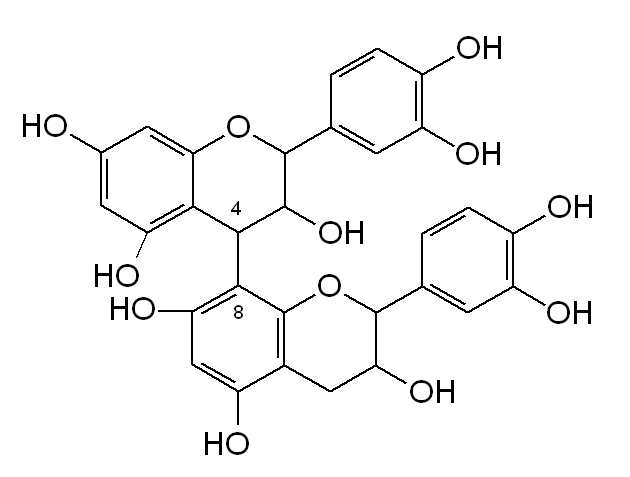
Dimeric 4→8 B type proanthocyanidin chemical structure

The 4-8 bond can be in the alpha or in the beta position.

- Procyanidin B1 or epicatechin-(4β→8)-catechin
- Procyanidin B2 or (−)-epicatechin-(4β→8)-(−)-epicatechin
- Procyanidin B3 or catechin-(4α→8)-catechin
- Procyanidin B4 or catechin-(4α→8)-epicatechin

=== Molecules with 4→6 bonds ===
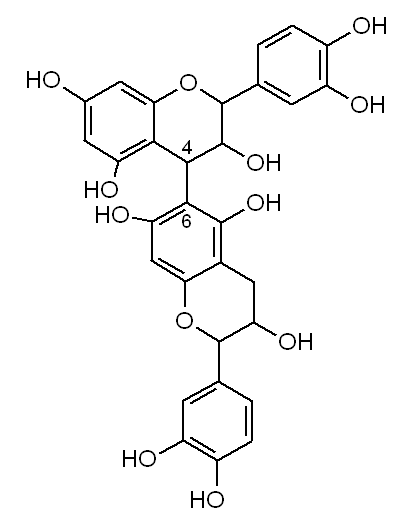
chemical structure of a 4-6 dimeric B type proanthocyanidin

- Procyanidin B5 or epicatechin-(4β→6)-epicatechin
- Procyanidin B6 or catechin-(4α→6)-catechin
- Procyanidin B8 or catechin-(4α→6)-epicatechin

=== Chemistry ===
B-type procyanidin (catechin dimer) can be converted to A-type procyanidin by radical oxidation.

Dimeric proanthocyanidins can also be synthesized with procyanidin-rich grape seed extracts reacted with flavan-3-ols under acid catalysis.

== Trimeric B type proanthocyanidins ==
- Procyanidin C1
- Procyanidin C2

=== Chemical synthesis ===
A stereoselective synthesis of benzylated catechin trimer under intermolecular condensation is achieved using equimolar amount of dimeric catechin nucleophile and monomeric catechin electrophile catalyzed by AgOTf or AgBF_{4}. The coupled product can be transformed into procyanidin C2 by a known procedure.

== Iterative oligomer chemical synthesis ==
A coupling utilising a C8-boronic acid as a directing group was developed in the synthesis of natural procyanidin B3 (i.e., 3,4-trans-(+)-catechin-4α→8-(+)-catechin dimer). The key interflavan bond is forged using a novel Lewis acid-promoted coupling of C4-ether 6 with C8-boronic acid 16 to provide the α-linked dimer with high diastereoselectivity. Through the use of a boron protecting group, the new coupling procedure can be extended to the synthesis of a protected procyanidin trimer analogous to natural procyanidin C2.

== See also ==
- Procyanidin dimer
