= Procyanidin C2 =

Names
- IUPAC name [(2R,3S,4S)-Flavan-3,3′,4′,5,7-pentol]-(4→8)-[(2R,3S,4R)-flavan-3,3′,4′,5,7-pentol]-(4→8)-[(2R,3S)-flavan-3,3′,4′,5,7-pentol]
- Preferred IUPAC name (1^{2}R,1^{3}S,1^{4}S,2^{2}R,2^{3}S,2^{4}R,3^{2}R,3^{3}S)-1^{2},2^{2},3^{2}-Tris(3,4-dihydroxyphenyl)-1^{3},1^{4},2^{3},2^{4},3^{3},3^{4}-hexahydro-1^{2}H,2^{2}H,3^{2}H-[1^{4},2^{8}:2^{4},3^{8}-ter-1-benzopyran]-1^{3},1^{5},1^{7},2^{3},2^{5},2^{7},3^{3},3^{5},3^{7}-nonol
- Other names C-(4,8)-C-(4,8)-C; Procyanidin trimer C2; Catechin-(4alpha→8)-Catechin-(4alpha→8)-Catechin; Catechin-(4α→8)-catechin-(4α→8)-catechin; Trimer C2

Identifiers
CAS Number	37064-31-6
3D model (JSmol)	Interactive image
ChEBI	CHEBI:75644
ChemSpider	9357147
PubChem CID	11182062
CompTox Dashboard (EPA)	DTXSID001028796
- InChI: InChI=1S/C45H38O18/c46-18-10-27(54)33-32(11-18)61-42(16-2-5-21(48)25(52)8-16)39(59)37(33)35-29(56)14-30(57)36-38(40(60)43(63-45(35)36)17-3-6-22(49)26(53)9-17)34-28(55)13-23(50)19-12-31(58)41(62-44(19)34)15-1-4-20(47)24(51)7-15/h1-11,13-14,31,37-43,46-60H,12H2/t31-,37-,38+,39-,40-,41+,42+,43+/m0/s1 Key: MOJZMWJRUKIQGL-WNCKYJNFSA-N
- SMILES: Oc8ccc(cc8O)C(C1O)Oc7cc(O)cc(O)c7C1c3c(O)cc(O)c(c3OC(C5O)c(cc2O)ccc2O)C5c4c6OC(c(cc9O)ccc9O)C(O)Cc6c(O)cc4O

Properties
Chemical formula	C_{45}H_{38}O_{18}
Molar mass	866.74 g/mol
- Except where otherwise noted, data are given for materials in their standard state (at 25 °C [77 °F], 100 kPa). Infobox references

Procyanidin C2 is a B type proanthocyanidin trimer, a type of condensed tannin.

== Natural occurrences ==
Procyanidin C2 is found in grape seeds (Vitis vinifera) and wine, in barley (Hordeum vulgare), malt and beer, in Betula spp., in Pinus radiata, in Potentilla viscosa, in Salix caprea or in Cryptomeria japonica.

The contents in barley grain of trimeric proanthocyanidins, including procyanidin C2, range from 53 to 151 μg catechin equivalents/g.

== Possible health uses ==
Proanthocyanidin oligomers, extracted from grape seeds, have been used for the experimental treatment of androgenic alopecia. When applied topically, they promote hair growth in vitro, and induce anagen in vivo. Procyanidin C2 is the subtype of extract most effective.

Experiments showed that both procyanidin C2 and Pycnogenol (French maritime pine bark extract) increase TNF-α secretion in a concentration- and time-dependent manner. These results demonstrate that procyanidins act as modulators of the immune response in macrophages.

== Chemistry ==
In the presence of procyanidin C2, the red color of the anthocyanin oenin appears more stable. However, the HPLC chromatogram shows a decrease in the amplitude of the peaks of oenin and procyanidin C2. Concomitantly, a new peak appears with a maximal absorption in the red region. This newly formed pigment probably comes from the condensation of oenin and procyanidin C2.

=== Chemical synthesis ===
A stereoselective synthesis of benzylated catechin trimer under intermolecular condensation is achieved using equimolar amount of dimeric catechin nucleophile and monomeric catechin electrophile catalyzed by AgOTf or AgBF_{4}. The coupled product can be transformed into procyanidin C2 by a known procedure.

The stereoselective synthesis of seven benzylated proanthocyanidin trimers (epicatechin-(4β-8)-epicatechin-(4β-8)-epicatechin trimer (procyanidin C1), catechin-(4α-8)-catechin-(4α-8)-catechin trimer (procyanidin C2), epicatechin-(4β-8)-epicatechin-(4β-8)-catechin trimer and epicatechin-(4β-8)-catechin-(4α-8)-epicatechin trimer derivatives) can be achieved with TMSOTf-catalyzed condensation reaction, in excellent yields. The structure of benzylated procyanidin C2 was confirmed by comparing the 1H NMR spectra of protected procyanidin C2 that was synthesized by two different condensation approaches. Finally, deprotection of (+)-catechin and (−)-epicatechin trimers derivatives gives four natural procyanidin trimers in good yields.

Molar equivalents of synthetic (2R,3S,4R or S)-leucocyanidin and (+)-catechin condense with exceptional rapidity at pH 5 under ambient conditions to give the all-trans-[4,8]- and [4,6]-bi-[(+)-catechins] (procyanidins B3, B6) the all-trans-[4,8:4,8]- and [4,8:4,6]-tri-[(+)-catechins] (procyanidin C2 and isomer).

=== Iterative oligomer chemical synthesis ===
A coupling utilising a C8-boronic acid as a directing group was developed in the synthesis of natural procyanidin B3 (i.e., 3,4-trans-(+)-catechin-4α→8-(+)-catechin dimer). The key interflavan bond is forged using a Lewis acid-promoted coupling of C4-ether with C8-boronic acid to provide the α-linked dimer with high diastereoselectivity. Through the use of a boron protecting group, the coupling procedure can be extended to the synthesis of a protected procyanidin trimer analogous to natural procyanidin C2.

== See also ==
- Phenolic content in wine
