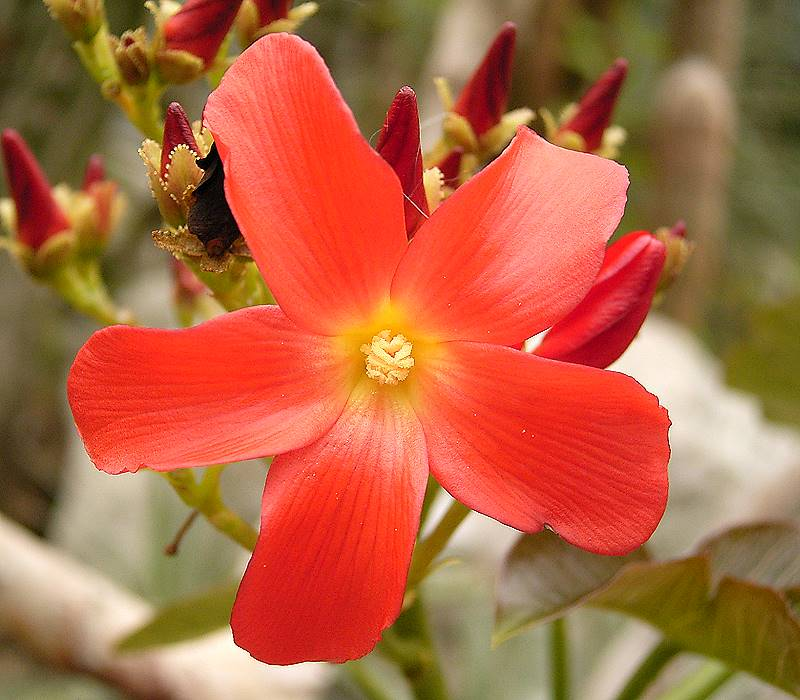
- Flower closeup

Scientific classification
- Kingdom: Plantae
- Clade: Tracheophytes
- Clade: Angiosperms
- Clade: Eudicots
- Clade: Rosids
- Order: Malpighiales
- Family: Euphorbiaceae
- Genus: Jatropha
- Species: J. macrantha

Binomial name
- Jatropha macrantha Mull. Arg (1865)

Synonyms
- Jatropha aphrodisiaca

= Jatropha macrantha =

Species of plant

Jatropha macrantha, also called the huanarpo macho, is a medium size shrubby tree species in the genus Jatropha with orange red flowers. It is indigenous to Peru. It is as popular in Peru as Muira Puama is in Brazil.

Catechin, catechin-7-O-β-glucopyranoside and procyanidin B3 can be found in Huanarpo Macho.
