= Procyanidin C1 =

- Chemical structure of procyanidin C1

Names
- IUPAC name [(2R,3R,4R)-Flavan-3,3′,4′,5,7-pentol]-(4→8)-[(2R,3R,4S)-flavan-3,3′,4′,5,7-pentol]-(4→8)-[(2R,3R)-flavan-3,3′,4′,5,7-pentol]
- Systematic IUPAC name (1^{2}R,1^{3}R,1^{4}R,2^{2}R,2^{3}R,2^{4}S,3^{2}R,3^{3}R)-1^{2},2^{2},3^{2}-Tris(3,4-dihydroxyphenyl)-1^{2}H,2^{2}H,3^{2}H-[1^{4},2^{8}:2^{4},3^{8}-ter-1-benzopyran]-1^{3},1^{5},1^{7},2^{3},2^{5},2^{7},3^{3},3^{5},3^{7}-nonol
- Other names Procyanidin C1; Procyanidol C1; Epicatechin-(4.beta.-->8)epicatechin-(4.beta.-->8)epicatechin; Epicatechin-(4β→8)-epicatechin--(4β→8)-epicatechin

Identifiers
CAS Number	37064-30-5
3D model (JSmol)	Interactive image
ChEBI	CHEBI:75643
ChEMBL	ChEMBL290632
ChemSpider	148540
KEGG	C17624
PubChem CID	169853
UNII	33516LCW4F
CompTox Dashboard (EPA)	DTXSID10190562
- InChI: InChI=1S/C45H38O18/c46-18-10-27(54)33-32(11-18)61-42(16-2-5-21(48)25(52)8-16)39(59)37(33)35-29(56)14-30(57)36-38(40(60)43(63-45(35)36)17-3-6-22(49)26(53)9-17)34-28(55)13-23(50)19-12-31(58)41(62-44(19)34)15-1-4-20(47)24(51)7-15/h1-11,13-14,31,37-43,46-60H,12H2/t31-,37-,38+,39-,40-,41-,42-,43-/m1/s1 Key: MOJZMWJRUKIQGL-XILRTYJMSA-N; InChI=1/C45H38O18/c46-18-10-27(54)33-32(11-18)61-42(16-2-5-21(48)25(52)8-16)39(59)37(33)35-29(56)14-30(57)36-38(40(60)43(63-45(35)36)17-3-6-22(49)26(53)9-17)34-28(55)13-23(50)19-12-31(58)41(62-44(19)34)15-1-4-20(47)24(51)7-15/h1-11,13-14,31,37-43,46-60H,12H2/t31-,37-,38+,39-,40-,41-,42-,43-/m1/s1 Key: MOJZMWJRUKIQGL-XILRTYJMBW
- SMILES: c1cc(c(cc1[C@@H]2[C@@H](Cc3c(cc(c(c3O2)[C@H]4c5c(cc(c(c5O[C@@H]([C@@H]4O)c6ccc(c(c6)O)O)[C@H]7c8c(cc(cc8O[C@@H]([C@@H]7O)c9ccc(c(c9)O)O)O)O)O)O)O)O)O)O)O

Properties
Chemical formula	C_{45}H_{38}O_{18}
Molar mass	866.77 g/mol
- Except where otherwise noted, data are given for materials in their standard state (at 25 °C [77 °F], 100 kPa). verify (what is ?) Infobox references

Procyanidin C1 (PCC1) is a B type proanthocyanidin. It is an epicatechin trimer found in grape (Vitis vinifera), unripe apples, and cinnamon.

== Natural occurrence and function ==
Procyanidin C1 can be isolated from grape seed extract.

== Chemical synthesis ==
The stereoselective synthesis of seven benzylated proanthocyanidin trimers (epicatechin-(4β-8)-epicatechin-(4β-8)-epicatechin trimer (procyanidin C1), catechin-(4α-8)-catechin-(4α-8)-catechin trimer (procyanidin C2), epicatechin-(4β-8)-epicatechin-(4β-8)-catechin trimer and epicatechin-(4β-8)-catechin-(4α-8)-epicatechin trimer derivatives) can be achieved with TMSOTf-catalyzed condensation reaction, in excellent yields. The structure of benzylated procyanidin C2 was confirmed by comparing the 1H NMR spectra of protected procyanidin C2 that was synthesized by two different condensation approaches. Finally, deprotection of (+)-catechin and (-)-epicatechin trimers derivatives gives four natural procyanidin trimers in good yields.

== Research ==
Procyanidin C1 has been shown to be an effective senolytic agent in wild-type mice, with effects of increased lifespan, reduced senescence markers and making them fitter. It was also found to greatly increase the effectiveness of chemotherapy in mice in which human prostate tumor cells were implanted.

== See also ==
- Phenolic content in wine
