= Garabato =

Garabato may refer to:

- Garabato (band), a Puerto Rican rock music band
- Uncaria guianensis, a plant species found in Guyana
