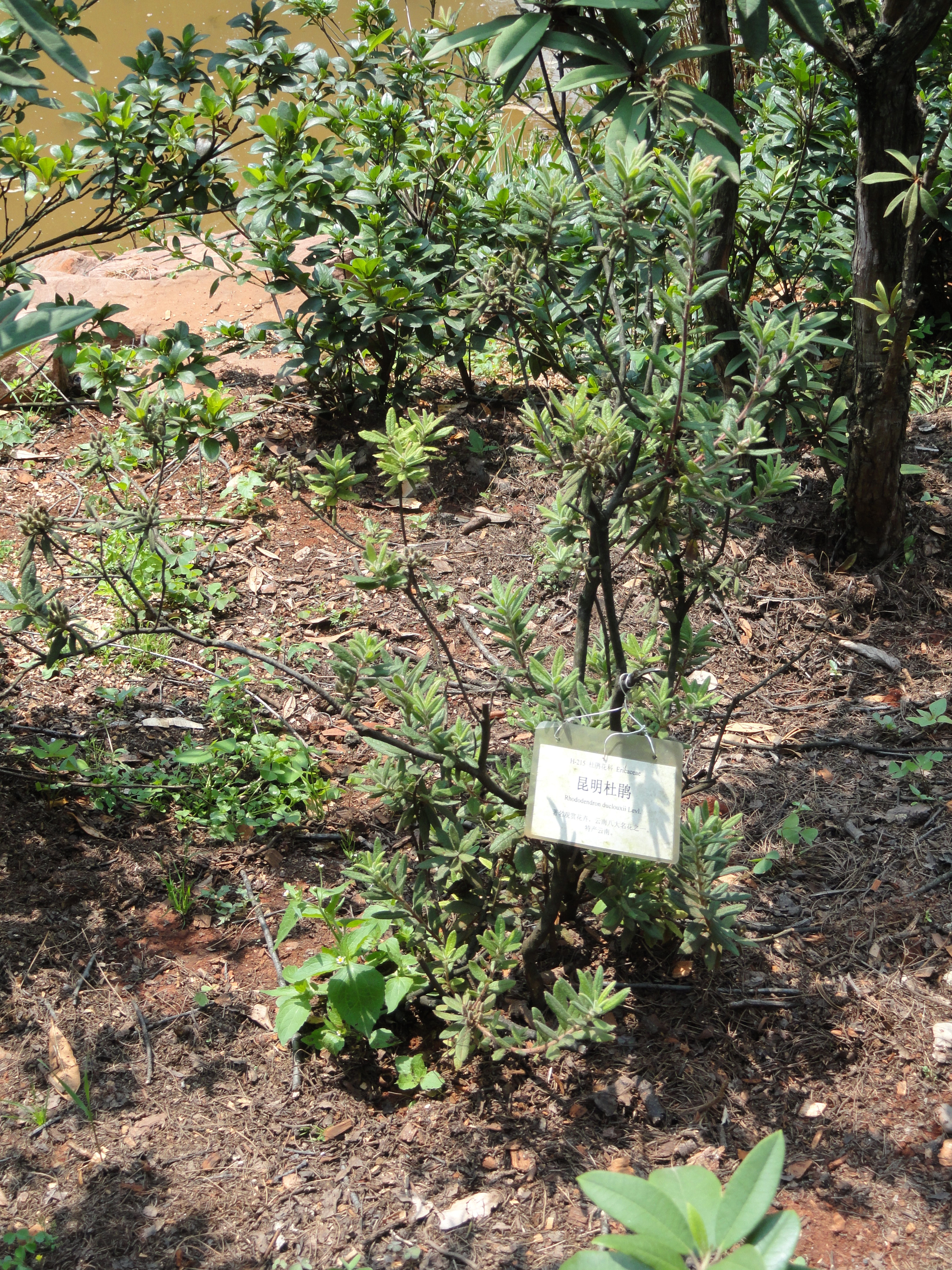
- In Kunming Botanical Garden

Scientific classification
- Kingdom: Plantae
- Clade: Tracheophytes
- Clade: Angiosperms
- Clade: Eudicots
- Clade: Asterids
- Order: Ericales
- Family: Ericaceae
- Genus: Rhododendron
- Species: R. × duclouxii

Binomial name
- Rhododendron × duclouxii H.Lév.

= Rhododendron × duclouxii =

Species of plant

Rhododendron × duclouxii is a hybrid rhododendron species native to Yunnan, China. Its parents are R. spiciferum and R. spinuliferum.
