= Procyanidin B1 =

- Chemical structure of procyanidin B2

Names
- IUPAC name [(2R,3R,4R)-Flavan-3,3′,4′,5,7-pentol]-(4→8)-[(2R,3S)-flavan-3,3′,4′,5,7-pentol]
- Systematic IUPAC name (2R,2′R,3R,3′S,4R)-2,2′-Bis(3,4-dihydroxyphenyl)-3,3′,4,4′-tetrahydro-2H,2′H-[4,8′-bi-1-benzopyran]-3,3′,5,5′,7,7′-hexol
- Other names Procyanidin B1 cis,trans′′-4,8′′-Bi-(3,3′,4′,5,7-Pentahydroxyflavane)

Identifiers
CAS Number	20315-25-7
3D model (JSmol)	Interactive image
ChEBI	CHEBI:75633
ChEMBL	ChEMBL504937
ChemSpider	9425166
PubChem CID	11250133
UNII	0566J48E7X
- InChI: InChI=1S/C30H26O12/c31-13-7-20(37)24-23(8-13)41-29(12-2-4-16(33)19(36)6-12)27(40)26(24)25-21(38)10-17(34)14-9-22(39)28(42-30(14)25)11-1-3-15(32)18(35)5-11/h1-8,10,22,26-29,31-40H,9H2/t22-,26+,27+,28+,29+/m0/s1 Key: XFZJEEAOWLFHDH-UKWJTHFESA-N
- SMILES: O[C@H]1Cc2c(O)cc(O)c([C@@H]3[C@@H](O)[C@H](Oc4cc(O)cc(O)c34)c3ccc(O)c(O)c3)c2O[C@@H]1c1ccc(O)c(O)c1

Properties
Chemical formula	C_{30}H_{26}O_{12}
Molar mass	578.52 g/mol
- Except where otherwise noted, data are given for materials in their standard state (at 25 °C [77 °F], 100 kPa). verify (what is ?) Infobox references

Procyanidin B1 is a procyanidin dimer.

It is a molecule with a 4→8 bond (epicatechin-(4β→8)-catechin). Proanthocyanidin-B1 can be found in Cinnamomum verum (Ceylon cinnamon, in the rind, bark or cortex), in Uncaria guianensis (cat's claw, in the root), and in Vitis vinifera (common grape vine, in the leaf) or in peach.

Procyanidin B1 can be converted into procyanidin A1 by radical oxidation using 1,1-diphenyl-2-picrylhydrazyl (DPPH) radicals under neutral conditions.

== See also ==
- Phenolic content in wine
