= Cesare Romiti =

Italian economist and businessman (1923–2020)

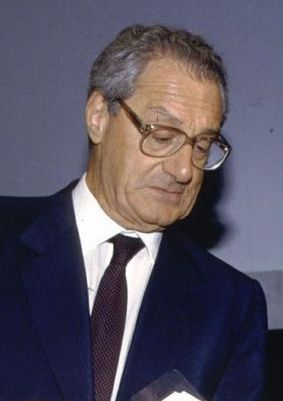
- Born: 24 June 1923; Rome, Kingdom of Italy
- Died: 18 August 2020 (aged 97); Milan, Italy
- Occupations: Economist and business executive
- Spouse: Luigia Castaldi (m. 1948; died 2001)
- Children: Maurizio (born 1949); Piergiorgio (born 1951)

Cesare Romiti (24 June 1923 – 18 August 2020) was an Italian economist and businessman. He was best known as an executive of both state-owned firms and private companies, including Fiat and Alitalia. He acquired the nickname Il Duro ("The Tough Guy") referring to his management style while he was serving as the head of Fiat.

== Early life and education ==
Romiti was born in Rome on 24 June 1923. His father worked as a post office worker who was dismissed from his job due to his opposition to the fascist government of Benito Mussolini. He had two brothers, and his family was poor. Romiti later described how he stole a bag of flour from a deposit during the German occupation of his hometown and that it was "welcomed like manna at home". He subsequently received a degree in economics and commercial sciences in 1945.

== Career and activities ==
Romiti began his career at the Bombrini Parodi Delfino munitions group in 1947. When the group merged with Snia Viscosa in 1968, he began to serve as the latter's general financial director. Next, he joined Alitalia. In December 1970, he became a board member of Alitalia and then was appointed general manager and chief executive of the company. His term at the company lasted until 1973. In September 1973, he became the chief executive officer of the IRI finance firm, Italstat.

Romiti worked for Fiat in various capacities for twenty years from 1974 to 1995. He was also one of the major shareholders of the company. After joining the company in 1974, amidst the oil crisis that affected the automobile industry, he went on to become CEO six years later. Shortly afterwards, he played a part in breaking up a strike by factory workers, which was started when Fiat proposed dismissing 14,000 employees. Romiti, together with approximately 40,000 managers from the company and other white-collar workers, demonstrated in Turin calling for the right to work. He laid blame on the Red Brigades, contending that they had pervaded the leadership of the Italian General Confederation of Labour. Consequently, he was the target of an attempted kidnapping. The strike ended after several weeks, with the laid-off employees granted unemployment benefits. Romiti asserted that the future of Fiat and its employees had been secured.

In April 1997, Romiti was convicted of falsifying the company accounts, committing tax fraud, and making illegal payments to political parties for the period between 1980 and 1992. Finding Romiti guilty, the court in Fiat's headquarters in Turin handed him an eighteen-month suspended prison term. In 2000, the Supreme Court commuted the sentence to eleven months and ten days for the same charges. In December 2003, the Court of Appeal in Turin revoked the sentence for false accounting.

Romiti succeeded Gianni Agnelli as the chairman of the firm when Agnelli stepped down. Romiti led the firm from 28 February 1996 to 22 June 1998. He was instrumental in the company's return to profitability during this period. He achieved this by having Fiat launch new car models and shutting down the company's historic factory in Lingotto. Paolo Fresco succeeded him in the aforementioned post.

Romiti was the chairman of the board of RCS Quotidiani S.p.A. from 2 June 1998 to 15 July 2004. He then served as the chairman of Impregilo from May 2005 to 2007. He became the president of Italian China Institution in 2000 and was also appointed its president in 2004. He was also an advisor professor at Donghua University. He was given honorary citizenship by China in 2006, in recognition of his endeavours to boost ties between the two countries.

== Personal life and death ==
Romiti married Luigia Gastaldi in 1948 and was married until her death in 2001. Romiti and his wife had two sons, Maurizio (born 1949) and Piergiorgio (born 1951). He died on 18 August 2020 in his home in Milan at the age of 97.

== Honours and awards ==
Romiti was the recipient of various state honours, including:

- Officer of the National Order of the Legion d'Honneur (France)
- Knight of the Order of Merit for Labour (Italy, 1978)
- Knight of the Grand Cross Order of Merit of the Italian Republic (Italy, 1984)

In addition, Romiti was awarded by various organizations, including the Chinese people's association for friendship with foreign countries. He was named as honorary chairman of the Aspen Institute. On 21 June 2004, he became the honorary president of RCS MediaGroup.

== Books ==
- George S. Odiorne; Cesare Romiti (1990). MBO. Management by Objectives. Economia e management (n. 0009). Milan: Sperling & Kupfer. pp. xi, 412. ISBN 9788820004835. OCLC 848880262.
- Michael E Porter; Cesare Romiti; Wallter Giorgio Scott; Riccardo Varaldo (1992). Competizione globale (6th ed.). Turin: Isvor-FIAT, Isedi. pp. xxxii, 681. OCLC 878943684.
- Francesco Perrini; Matteo Piccinali; Cesare Romiti (2010). Investimenti e contratti in Cina. Impresa & professionisti (in Italian). Milan: EGEA. pp. xxiv, 319. ISBN 9788823832831. OCLC 878748211.
- Giampaolo Pansa; Cesare Romiti (1988). Questi anni alla Fiat. BUR saggi (in Italian) (1st ed.). Milan: Rizzoli. ISBN 9788817536233. OCLC 449934087.
- Cesare Romiti; Paolo Madron (2012). Storia segreta del capitalismo italiano: cinquant'anni di economia, finanza e politica raccontati da un grande protagonista. Le spade (n. 28) (in Italian). Milan: Longanesi. p. 286. ISBN 9788830428126. OCLC 811153654.
- Cesare Romiti; Antonio Mosconi (1977). La politica industriale e la politica monetaria – la fiat nel processo d'integrazione europea (in Italian). OCLC 848254717.
