= Procyanidin A2 =

- Chemical structure of proanthocyanidin A2

Names
- IUPAC name (2R,3R,8S,14R,15R)-2,8-bis(3,4-dihydroxyphenyl)-2,3,4,14-tetrahydro-8,14-methanobenzo[7,8][1,3]dioxocino[4,5-h]chromene-3,5,11,13,15-pentaol
- Other names Dimeric catechin Procyanidin A2; Procyanidol A2; Proanthocyanidin A-2; Procyanidin dimer A2 (+)-Proanthocyanidin A2; Epicatechin-(2β→7,4β→8)-epicatechin

Identifiers
CAS Number	41743-41-3
3D model (JSmol)	Interactive image
ChEBI	CHEBI:28472
ChemSpider	110541
PubChem CID	124025
UNII	UQN6668Q4R
CompTox Dashboard (EPA)	DTXSID00904175
- InChI: InChI=1S/C30H24O12/c31-13-7-20(37)24-22(8-13)41-30(12-2-4-16(33)19(36)6-12)29(39)26(24)25-23(42-30)10-17(34)14-9-21(38)27(40-28(14)25)11-1-3-15(32)18(35)5-11/h1-8,10,21,26-27,29,31-39H,9H2/t21-,26-,27-,29-,30+/m1/s1 Key: NSEWTSAADLNHNH-LSBOWGMISA-N; InChI=1/C30H24O12/c31-13-7-20(37)24-22(8-13)41-30(12-2-4-16(33)19(36)6-12)29(39)26(24)25-23(42-30)10-17(34)14-9-21(38)27(40-28(14)25)11-1-3-15(32)18(35)5-11/h1-8,10,21,26-27,29,31-39H,9H2/t21-,26-,27-,29-,30+/m1/s1 Key: NSEWTSAADLNHNH-LSBOWGMIBO
- SMILES: C1[C@H]([C@H](OC2=C3[C@@H]4[C@H]([C@@](OC5=CC(=CC(=C45)O)O)(OC3=CC(=C21)O)C6=CC(=C(C=C6)O)O)O)C7=CC(=C(C=C7)O)O)O

Properties
Chemical formula	C_{30}H_{24}O_{12}
Molar mass	576.510 g·mol^{−1}
- Except where otherwise noted, data are given for materials in their standard state (at 25 °C [77 °F], 100 kPa). verify (what is ?) Infobox references

Procyanidin A2 is an A type proanthocyanidin.

It is found in avocado, chestnut, cranberry juice concentrate, lychee fruit pericarp, peanut skins, Cinchona cortex, cinnamon cortex, Urvillea ulmaceae, and Ecdysanthera utilis.

== Synthesis ==
Procyanidin B2 can be converted into procyanidin A2 by radical oxidation using 1,1-diphenyl-2-picrylhydrazyl (DPPH) radicals under neutral conditions.
