= P. longifolia =

P. longifolia may refer to:

- Persoonia longifolia, the long-leaf persoonia or snottygobble, a small tree species found in Western Australia
- Physalis longifolia, the common groundcherry, a plant species native to North America
- Pinguicula longifolia, the long-leaved butterwort, a perennial carnivorous sub-alpine plant species found in the Central Pyrenees
- Polyalthia longifolia, a synonym of Monoon longifolium, the false ashoka, a small tree species native to southern India and Sri Lanka
- Potentilla longifolia, a plant species found in Russia and Mongolia
- Pulmonaria longifolia, the narrow-leaved lungwort, a plant species native to western Europe
