= Procyanidin B2 =

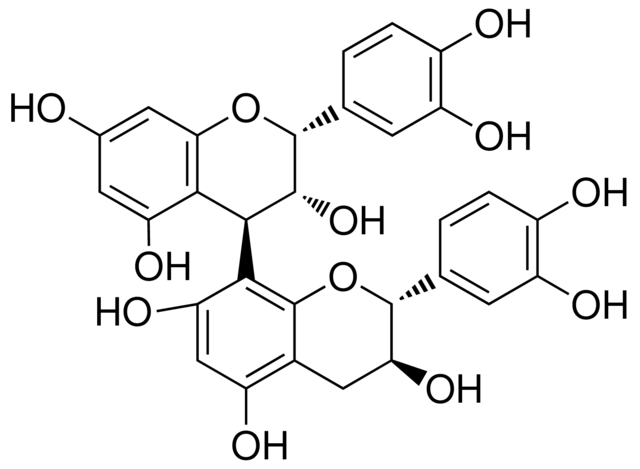
- Chemical structure of procyanidin B2

Names
- IUPAC name [(2R,3R,4R)-Flavan-3,3′,4′,5,7-pentol]-(4→8)-[(2R,3R)-flavan-3,3′,4′,5,7-pentol]
- Systematic IUPAC name (2R,2′R,3R,3′R,4R)-2,2′-Bis(3,4-dihydroxyphenyl)-3,3′,4,4′-tetrahydro-2H,2′H-[4,8′-bi-1-benzopyran]-3,3′,5,5′,7,7′-hexol
- Other names Procyanidin-B2 (−)-Epicatechin-(4β→8)-(−)-epicatechin

Identifiers
CAS Number	29106-49-8
3D model (JSmol)	Interactive image
ChEBI	CHEBI:75632
ChemSpider	109417
PubChem CID	122738
UNII	L88HKE854X
CompTox Dashboard (EPA)	DTXSID701028797
- InChI: InChI=1S/C30H26O12/c31-13-7-20(37)24-23(8-13)41-29(12-2-4-16(33)19(36)6-12)27(40)26(24)25-21(38)10-17(34)14-9-22(39)28(42-30(14)25)11-1-3-15(32)18(35)5-11/h1-8,10,22,26-29,31-40H,9H2/t22-,26-,27-,28-,29-/m1/s1 Key: XFZJEEAOWLFHDH-NFJBMHMQSA-N
- SMILES: O[C@@H]1Cc2c(O)cc(O)c([C@@H]3[C@@H](O)[C@H](Oc4cc(O)cc(O)c34)c3ccc(O)c(O)c3)c2O[C@@H]1c1ccc(O)c(O)c1

Properties
Chemical formula	C_{30}H_{26}O_{12}
Molar mass	578.52 g/mol
- Except where otherwise noted, data are given for materials in their standard state (at 25 °C [77 °F], 100 kPa). verify (what is ?) Infobox references

Procyanidin B2 is a B type proanthocyanidin. Its structure is (−)-Epicatechin-(4β→8)-(−)-epicatechin.

Procyanidin B2 can be found in Cinchona pubescens (Chinchona: in the rind, bark, and cortex), in Cinnamomum verum (Ceylon cinnamon: in the rind, bark, and cortex), in Crataegus monogyna (Common hawthorn: in the flower and blossom), in Uncaria guianensis (Cat's claw: in the root), in Vitis vinifera (Common grape vine: in the leaf), in Litchi chinensis (litchi: in the pericarp), in the apple, and in Ecdysanthera utilis.

Procyanidin B2 can be converted into procyanidin A2 by radical oxidation using 1,1-diphenyl-2-picrylhydrazyl (DPPH) radicals under neutral conditions.

Procyanidin B2 has been shown to inhibit the formation of the advanced glycation end-products pentosidine, carboxymethyllysine (CML), and methylglyoxal (MGO).

== See also ==
- Phenolic content in wine
