= DPPH radical scavenging assay =

DPPH radical scavenging assay is a method for determining antioxidant radical scavenging on 2,2-diphenyl-1-picrylhydrazyl (DPPH) by spectrophotometric measurement. The method was developed by Marsden Blois and reported in April 1958.

DPPH radicals were discovered during 1922 by Goldschmidt and Renn which they described as α,α-diphenyl-β-trinitrophenyl-hydrazyl. DPPH absorbs at 515 517 nanometers.
