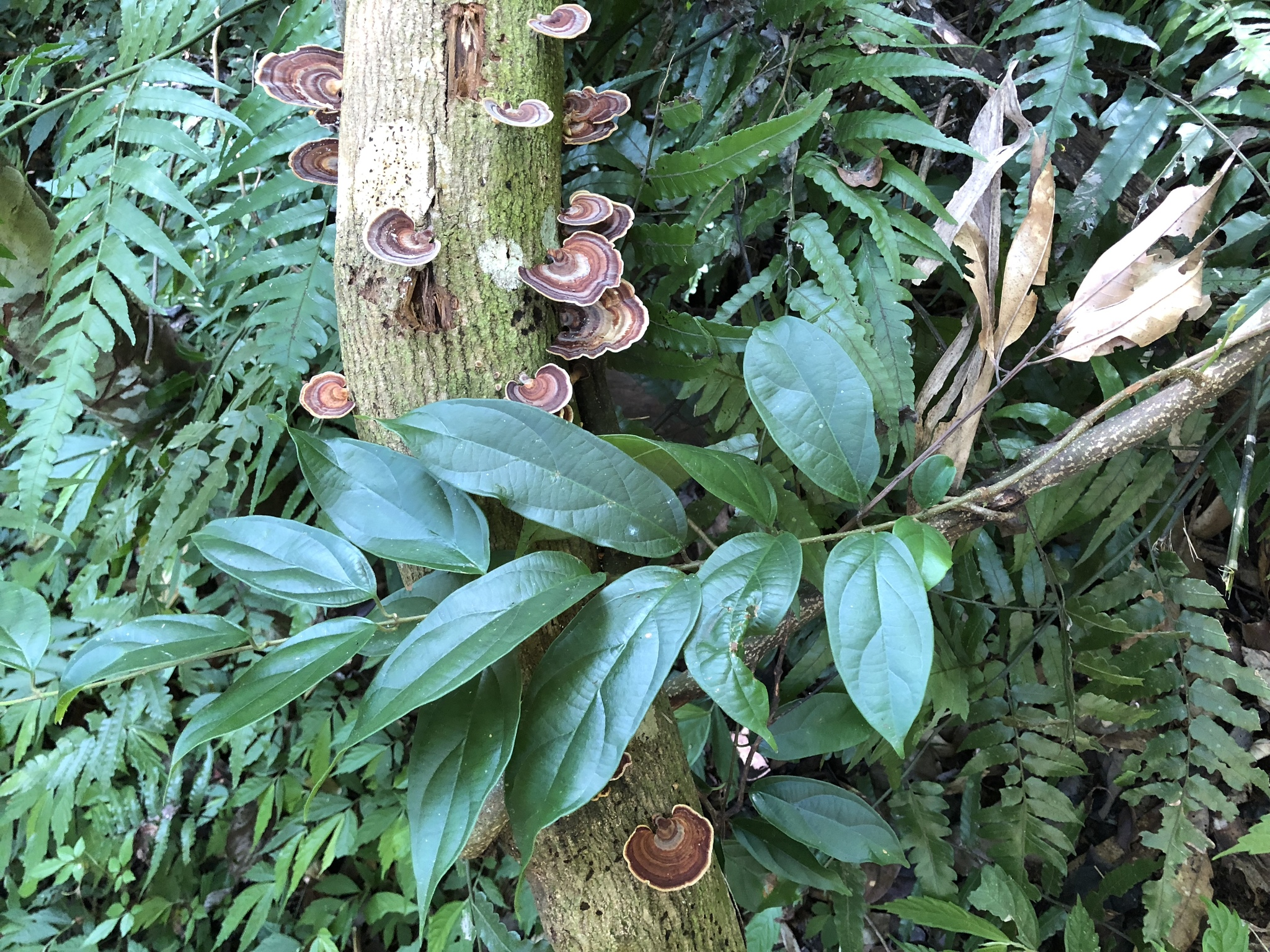
- In Taiwan

Scientific classification
- Kingdom: Plantae
- Clade: Tracheophytes
- Clade: Angiosperms
- Clade: Eudicots
- Clade: Asterids
- Order: Gentianales
- Family: Apocynaceae
- Genus: Urceola
- Species: U. micrantha

Binomial name
- Urceola micrantha (Wall. ex G.Don) D.J.Middleton

Synonyms
- List: Chavannesia montana (M.R.Hend.) Pichon; Cudicia gyrandra Buch.-Ham. ex Dillwyn; Ecdysanthera annamensis Vernet; Ecdysanthera brachiata A.DC.; Ecdysanthera cambodiensis Pierre; Ecdysanthera langbiani Vernet; Ecdysanthera linearicarpa Pierre; Ecdysanthera linocarpa Pierre; Ecdysanthera micrantha (Wall. ex G.Don) A.DC.; Ecdysanthera multiflora King & Gamble; Ecdysanthera utilis Hayata & Kawak.; Echites brachiatus Wall.; Echites micranthus Wall. ex G.Don; Parabarium brachiatum (A.DC.) Pierre ex Spire; Parabarium cambodiensis (Pierre) Pierre ex Spire; Parabarium candollei Pierre ex Spire; Parabarium chevalieri Pit.; Parabarium diu-do Dubard & Eberh.; Parabarium langbiani (Vernet) Pichon; Parabarium linearicarpum (Pierre) Pichon; Parabarium linocarpum Pierre ex Spire; Parabarium micranthum (Wall. ex G.Don) Pierre; Parabarium multiflorum (King & Gamble) Lý; Parabarium spireanum Pierre ex Spire; Parabarium utile (Hayata & Kawak.) Lý; Parabarium vernetii Pierre ex Spire; Urceola linearicarpa (Pierre) D.J.Middleton; Urceola montana M.R.Hend.

= Urceola micrantha =

Species of plant in the dogbane family

Urceola micrantha is a plant species in the family Apocynaceae. It is a shrub widespread across much of East Asia, Southeast Asia, and the Himalayas.

In Taïwan, it is used in folk medicine as an analgesic, antiphlogistic and spasmolytic agent.

The species contains proanthocyanidin B2, proanthocyanidin A1 and proanthocyanidin A2.
