= Procyanidin B4 =

- Chemical structure of procyanidin B

Names
- IUPAC name [(2R,3S,4S)-Flavan-3,3′,4′,5,7-pentol]-(4→8)-[(2R,3R)-flavan-3,3′,4′,5,7-pentol]
- Systematic IUPAC name (2R,2′R,3S,3′R,4S)-2,2′-Bis(3,4-dihydroxyphenyl)-3,3′,4,4′-tetrahydro-2H,2′H-[4,8′-bi-1-benzopyran]-3,3′,5,5′,7,7′-hexol
- Other names Procyanidin B4

Identifiers
CAS Number	29106-51-2
3D model (JSmol)	Interactive image
ChEBI	CHEBI:27589
ChEMBL	ChEMBL447373
ChemSpider	129882
KEGG	C10238
PubChem CID	147299
UNII	2OP8987K2X
CompTox Dashboard (EPA)	DTXSID50183357
- InChI: InChI=1S/C30H26O12/c31-13-7-20(37)24-23(8-13)41-29(12-2-4-16(33)19(36)6-12)27(40)26(24)25-21(38)10-17(34)14-9-22(39)28(42-30(14)25)11-1-3-15(32)18(35)5-11/h1-8,10,22,26-29,31-40H,9H2/t22-,26+,27+,28-,29-/m1/s1 Key: XFZJEEAOWLFHDH-VUGKQVTMSA-N
- SMILES: O[C@@H]1Cc2c(O)cc(O)c([C@H]3[C@H](O)[C@H](Oc4cc(O)cc(O)c34)c3ccc(O)c(O)c3)c2O[C@@H]1c1ccc(O)c(O)c1

Properties
Chemical formula	C_{30}H_{26}O_{12}
Molar mass	578.52 g/mol
- Except where otherwise noted, data are given for materials in their standard state (at 25 °C [77 °F], 100 kPa). verify (what is ?) Infobox references

Procyanidin B4 is a B type proanthocyanidin.

Procyanidin-B4 is a catechin-(4α→8)-epicatechin dimer. It is found in the litchi pericarp, in grape seeds, and, along with 4-cis-isomer of procyanidin B4, in beer.

== See also ==
- Phenolic content in wine
