= Procyanidin B8 =

Chemical compound

- Chemical structure of procyanidin B8

Names
- IUPAC name [(2R,3S,4R)-Flavan-3,3′,4′,5,7-pentol]-(4→6)-[(2R,3R)-flavan-3,3′,4′,5,7-pentol]
- Systematic IUPAC name (2R,2′R,3S,3′R,4R)-2,2′-Bis(3,4-dihydroxyphenyl)-3,3′,4,4′-tetrahydro-2H,2′H-[4,6′-bi-1-benzopyran]-3,3′,5,5′,7,7′-hexol
- Other names Procyanidin B8

Identifiers
CAS Number	12798-60-6
3D model (JSmol)	Interactive image
ChEBI	CHEBI:75618
ChEMBL	ChEMBL451115
ChemSpider	416636
PubChem CID	474541
UNII	KW4926C35L
CompTox Dashboard (EPA)	DTXSID701028816
- InChI: InChI=1S/C30H26O12/c31-13-7-19(36)24-23(8-13)42-30(12-2-4-16(33)18(35)6-12)28(40)26(24)25-20(37)10-22-14(27(25)39)9-21(38)29(41-22)11-1-3-15(32)17(34)5-11/h1-8,10,21,26,28-40H,9H2/t21-,26+,28+,29-,30-/m1/s1 Key: GMISZFQPFDAPGI-JJYFIROESA-N; InChI=1/C30H26O12/c31-13-7-19(36)24-23(8-13)42-30(12-2-4-16(33)18(35)6-12)28(40)26(24)25-20(37)10-22-14(27(25)39)9-21(38)29(41-22)11-1-3-15(32)17(34)5-11/h1-8,10,21,26,28-40H,9H2/t21-,26+,28+,29-,30-/m1/s1 Key: GMISZFQPFDAPGI-JJYFIROEBQ
- SMILES: O[C@@H]1Cc2c(O[C@@H]1c1ccc(O)c(O)c1)cc(O)c([C@H]1[C@H](O)[C@H](Oc3cc(O)cc(O)c13)c1ccc(O)c(O)c1)c2O

Properties
Chemical formula	C_{30}H_{26}O_{12}
Molar mass	578.52 g/mol
- Except where otherwise noted, data are given for materials in their standard state (at 25 °C [77 °F], 100 kPa). verify (what is ?) Infobox references

Procyanidin B8 is a B type proanthocyanidin.

Procyanidin B8 is a catechin-(4α→6)-epicatechin dimer. It can be found in grape seeds and in beer.
