= A-type proanthocyanidin =

A type proanthocyanidins are a specific type of proanthocyanidins, which are a class of flavonoid. Proanthocyanidins fall under a wide range of names in the nutritional and scientific vernacular, including oligomeric proanthocyanidins, flavonoids, polyphenols, condensed tannins, and OPCs. Proanthocyanidins were first popularized by French scientist Jacques Masquelier.

== Distribution in plants ==
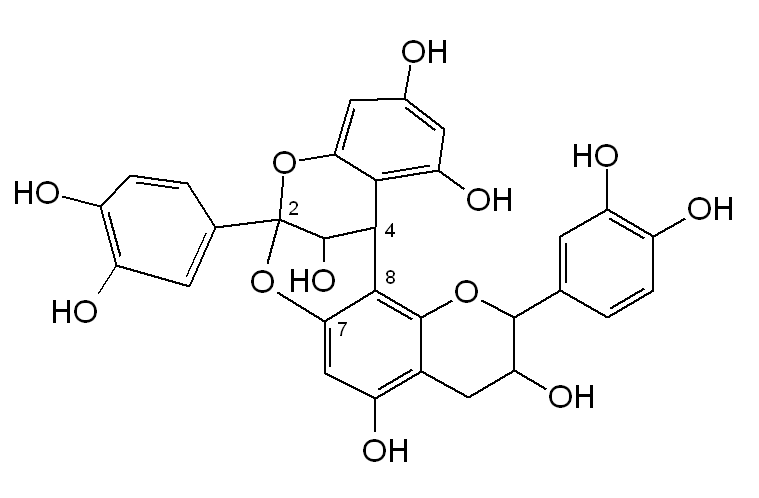
Schematic chemical structure of an A type proanthocyanidin dimer

A-type linkage is a less common feature in proanthocyanidins with both 4β→8 (B-type) and 2β→O→7 interflavanoid bonds.

A-type proanthocyanidin glycosides can be isolated from cocoa liquor.

=== Dimers ===
- Procyanidin A1 is an epicatechin-(2β→7,4β→8)-catechin dimer.
- Procyanidin A2 is a dimeric (-)epicatechin.

Other A-type proanthocyanidins can be found in cranberries, cinnamon, peanut skins and Geranium niveum.

== Chemistry ==
B-type procyanidins (catechin dimers) can be converted to A-type procyanidins by radical oxidation. Fragmentation patterns for A-type proanthocyanidins include heterocyclic ring fission (HRF), retro-Diels-Alder (RDA) fission, benzofuran-forming fission (BFF) and quinone methide fission (QM).

== Metabolism ==
The metabolism of type-A proanthocyanidins is significant since a large number of metabolites are detected in urine and feces soon after ingestion of foods rich in polymers, indicating rapid elimination and absence of physiological effect. Polymeric type-A proanthocyanidins are depolymerized into epicatechin units in the small intestine, then cleaved into smaller phenolic acids with no known biological role.

== Research ==
In vitro, A-type proanthocyanidins isolated from cranberry juice cocktail demonstrated anti-adhesion activity against E. coli binding to urinary tract epithelial cells, whereas B-type proanthocyanidins from grape exhibited minor activity. In humans, a 2014 review indicated there was insufficient clinical evidence that cranberry type-A proanthocyanidins are effective in lowering the risk of urinary tract infections (UTIs), while a 2023 review concluded that long-term consumption of cranberry products may reduce the risk of UTIs in certain groups.
