= Procyanidin B6 =

- Chemical structure of procyanidin B6

Names
- IUPAC name [(2R,3S,4R)-Flavan-3,3′,4′,5,7-pentol]-(4→6)-[(2R,3S)-flavan-3,3′,4′,5,7-pentol]
- Systematic IUPAC name (2R,3S,4R)-2-(3,4-Dihydroxyphenyl)-3-[(2R,3S)-2-(3,4-dihydroxyphenyl)-3,5,7-trihydroxy-3,4-dihydro-2H-1-benzopyran-6-yl]-3,4-dihydro-2H-1-benzopyran-3,5,7-triol
- Other names Procyanidin B6

Identifiers
| CAS Number | 12798-58-2 |
| 3D model (JSmol) | Interactive image |
| ChEBI | CHEBI:75619 |
| ChEMBL | ChEMBL502984 |
| ChemSpider | 416635 |
| PubChem CID | 474540 |
| UNII | SZ77QV8UB3 |
| CompTox Dashboard (EPA) | DTXSID001028815 |
- InChI: InChI=1S/C30H26O12/c31-13-7-19(36)24-23(8-13)42-30(12-2-4-16(33)18(35)6-12)28(40)26(24)25-20(37)10-22-14(27(25)39)9-21(38)29(41-22)11-1-3-15(32)17(34)5-11/h1-8,10,21,26,28-40H,9H2/t21-,26-,28-,29+,30+/m0/s1 Key: GMISZFQPFDAPGI-ZBRHZRBFSA-N; InChI=1/C30H26O12/c31-13-7-19(36)24-23(8-13)42-30(12-2-4-16(33)18(35)6-12)28(40)26(24)25-20(37)10-22-14(27(25)39)9-21(38)29(41-22)11-1-3-15(32)17(34)5-11/h1-8,10,21,26,28-40H,9H2/t21-,26-,28-,29+,30+/m0/s1 Key: GMISZFQPFDAPGI-ZBRHZRBFBC
- SMILES: Oc1ccc(cc1O)[C@H]5Oc6cc(O)c([C@@H]3c2c(cc(O)cc2O)O[C@@H]([C@H]3O)c4ccc(O)c(O)c4)c(O)c6C[C@@H]5O

Properties
| Chemical formula | C_{30}H_{26}O_{12} |
| Molar mass | 578.52 g/mol |
- Except where otherwise noted, data are given for materials in their standard state (at 25 °C [77 °F], 100 kPa). verify (what is ?) Infobox references

Procyanidin B6 is a B type proanthocyanidin.

Procyanidin B6 is a catechin-(4α→6)-catechin dimer. It can be found in grape seeds and in beer.

== Chemical synthesis ==
Molar equivalents of synthetic (2R,3S,4R or S)-leucocyanidin and (+)-catechin condense with exceptional rapidity at pH 5 under ambient conditions to give the all-trans-[4,8]- and [4,6]-bi-[(+)-catechins] (procyanidins B3 and B6) the all-trans-[4,8:4,8]- and [4,8:4,6]-tri-[(+)-catechins] (procyanidin C2 and isomer).
