= Procyanidin B3 =

- Chemical structure of procyanidin B3

Names
- IUPAC name [(2R,3S,4S)-Flavan-3,3′,4′,5,7-pentol]-(4→8)-[(2R,3S)-flavan-3,3′,4′,5,7-pentol]
- Systematic IUPAC name (2R,2′R,3S,3′S,4S)-2,2′-Bis(3,4-dihydroxyphenyl)-3,3′,4,4′-tetrahydro-2H,2′H-[4,8′-bi-1-benzopyran]-3,3′,5,5′,7,7′-hexol
- Other names Procyanidin B3

Identifiers
CAS Number	23567-23-9
3D model (JSmol)	Interactive image
ChEBI	CHEBI:75630
ChEMBL	ChEMBL501490
ChemSpider	129476
ECHA InfoCard	100.150.578
EC Number	621-754-2
PubChem CID	146798
UNII	2TC1A0KEAQ
CompTox Dashboard (EPA)	DTXSID60178193
- InChI: InChI=1S/C30H26O12/c31-13-7-20(37)24-23(8-13)41-29(12-2-4-16(33)19(36)6-12)27(40)26(24)25-21(38)10-17(34)14-9-22(39)28(42-30(14)25)11-1-3-15(32)18(35)5-11/h1-8,10,22,26-29,31-40H,9H2/t22-,26-,27-,28+,29+/m0/s1 Key: XFZJEEAOWLFHDH-AVFWISQGSA-N
- SMILES: O[C@H]1Cc2c(O)cc(O)c([C@H]3[C@H](O)[C@H](Oc4cc(O)cc(O)c34)c3ccc(O)c(O)c3)c2O[C@@H]1c1ccc(O)c(O)c1

Properties
Chemical formula	C_{30}H_{26}O_{12}
Molar mass	578.52 g/mol

Hazards
- GHS labelling
Pictograms	(GHS07: Exclamation mark)
Signal word	Warning
Hazard statements	H315, H319, H335
Precautionary statements	P261, P264, P271, P280, P302+P352, P304+P340, P305+P351+P338, P312, P321, P332+P313, P337+P313, P362, P403+P233, P405, P501
- Except where otherwise noted, data are given for materials in their standard state (at 25 °C [77 °F], 100 kPa). verify (what is ?) Infobox references

Procyanidin B3 is a B type proanthocyanidin. Procyanidin B3 is a catechin dimer (catechin-(4α→8)-catechin).

== Natural occurrences ==
It can be found in red wine, in barley, in beer, in peach or in Jatropha macrantha, the Huanarpo Macho.

== Health effects ==
It has been identified as a hair-growth stimulant.

== Chemical synthesis ==
Molar equivalents of synthetic (2R,3S,4R or S)-leucocyanidin and (+)-catechin condense with exceptional rapidity at pH 5 under ambient conditions to give the all-trans-[4,8]- and [4,6]-bi-[(+)-catechins] (procyanidins B3, B6) the all-trans-[4,8:4,8]- and [4,8:4,6]-tri-[(+)-catechins] (procyanidin C2 and isomer).

== See also ==
- Phenolic content in wine
