= Hydroxyquinol =

- Chemical structure of hydroxyquinol

Names
- Preferred IUPAC name Benzene-1,2,4-triol
- Other names Hydroxyhydroquinone; 1,2,4-Benzenetriol; 1,2,4-Trihydroxybenzene; Benzene-1,2,4-triol; 4-Hydroxycatechol; 2,4-Dihydroxyphenol; 1,3,4-Benzenetriol; 1,3,4-Trihydroxybenzene

Identifiers
CAS Number	533-73-3 =
3D model (JSmol)	Interactive image
ChEBI	CHEBI:16971
ChemSpider	10331
ECHA InfoCard	100.007.797
KEGG	C02814
PubChem CID	10787
UNII	173O8B04RD
CompTox Dashboard (EPA)	DTXSID3040930
- InChI: InChI=1S/C6H6O3/c7-4-1-2-5(8)6(9)3-4/h1-3,7-9H Key: GGNQRNBDZQJCCN-UHFFFAOYSA-N; InChI=1/C6H6O3/c7-4-1-2-5(8)6(9)3-4/h1-3,7-9H Key: GGNQRNBDZQJCCN-UHFFFAOYAX
- SMILES: Oc1cc(O)c(O)cc1

Properties
Chemical formula	C_{6}H_{6}O_{3}
Molar mass	126.11 g/mol
Appearance	white solid
Melting point	140.5 °C (284.9 °F; 413.6 K)
- Except where otherwise noted, data are given for materials in their standard state (at 25 °C [77 °F], 100 kPa). verify (what is ?) Infobox references

Hydroxyquinol is an organic compound with the formula C_{6}H_{3}(OH)_{3}. It is one of three isomeric benzenetriols. The compound is a colorless solid that is soluble in water. It reacts with air to give a black insoluble solid.

== Production ==
It is prepared industrially by acetylation of paraquinone with acetic anhydride followed by hydrolysis of the triacetate.

Historically, hydroxyquinol was produced by the action of potassium hydroxide on hydroquinone. It can also be prepared by dehydrating fructose.

C_{6}H_{12}O_{6} → 3 H_{2}O + C_{6}H_{6}O_{3}

== Natural occurrence ==
Hydroxyquinol is a common intermediate in the biodegradation of many aromatic compounds. These substrates include monochlorophenols, dichlorophenols, and more complex species such as the pesticide 2,4,5-T. Hydroxyquinol commonly occurs in nature as a biodegradation product of catechin, a natural phenol found in plants (e.g. by soil bacteria Bradyrhizobium japonicum). Hydroxyquinol is also a metabolite in some organisms. For instance, Hydroxyquinol 1,2-dioxygenase is an enzyme that uses hydroxyquinol as a substrate with oxygen to produce 3-hydroxy-cis,cis-muconate.
