= Procyanidin B5 =

- Chemical structure of procyanidin B5

Names
- IUPAC name [(2R,3R,4S)-Flavan-3,3′,4′,5,7-pentol]-(4→6)-[(2R,3R)-flavan-3,3′,4′,5,7-pentol]
- Systematic IUPAC name (2R,2′R,3R,3′R,4S)-2,2′-Bis(3,4-dihydroxyphenyl)-3,3′,4,4′-tetrahydro-2H,2′H-[4,6′-bi-1-benzopyran]-3,3′,5,5′,7,7′-hexol
- Other names Procyanidin B5

Identifiers
CAS Number	12798-57-1
3D model (JSmol)	Interactive image
ChEBI	CHEBI:75621
ChEMBL	ChEMBL506487
ChemSpider	110533
KEGG	C17640
PubChem CID	124017
UNII	W51N19H6K6
CompTox Dashboard (EPA)	DTXSID00155761
- InChI: InChI=1S/C30H26O12/c31-13-7-19(36)24-23(8-13)42-30(12-2-4-16(33)18(35)6-12)28(40)26(24)25-20(37)10-22-14(27(25)39)9-21(38)29(41-22)11-1-3-15(32)17(34)5-11/h1-8,10,21,26,28-40H,9H2/t21-,26-,28-,29-,30-/m1/s1 Key: GMISZFQPFDAPGI-CVJZBMGUSA-N; InChI=1/C30H26O12/c31-13-7-19(36)24-23(8-13)42-30(12-2-4-16(33)18(35)6-12)28(40)26(24)25-20(37)10-22-14(27(25)39)9-21(38)29(41-22)11-1-3-15(32)17(34)5-11/h1-8,10,21,26,28-40H,9H2/t21-,26-,28-,29-,30-/m1/s1 Key: GMISZFQPFDAPGI-CVJZBMGUBO
- SMILES: O[C@@H]1Cc2c(O[C@@H]1c1ccc(O)c(O)c1)cc(O)c([C@@H]1[C@@H](O)[C@H](Oc3cc(O)cc(O)c13)c1ccc(O)c(O)c1)c2O

Properties
Chemical formula	C_{30}H_{26}O_{12}
Molar mass	578.52 g/mol
- Except where otherwise noted, data are given for materials in their standard state (at 25 °C [77 °F], 100 kPa). verify (what is ?) Infobox references

Procyanidin B5 is a B type proanthocyanidin.

Procyanidin B5 is an epicatechin-(4β → 6)-epicatechin dimer.

== Natural occurrences ==
It can be found in grape seeds, in Hibiscus cannabinus (kenaf) root and bark, and in black chokeberries (Aronia melanocarpa).

Presence in food

It is found in cocoa beans and chocolate.
