= Leucocyanidin =

Names
- IUPAC name (2R,3S,4S)-Flavan-3,3′,4,4′,5,7-hexol
- Systematic IUPAC name (2R,3S,4S)-2-(3,4-Dihydroxyphenyl)-3,4-dihydro-2H-1-benzopyran-3,4,5,7-tetrol
- Other names Leucocianidol; Leucocianidolum; Leucocyanidol; Leukocyanidine; Procyanidol; Resivit; Leucoanthocyanidol; Vitamin P faktor 3,4-Cyanidiol (2R,3S,4S)-3,4,5,7,4-pentahydroxyflavan

Identifiers
CAS Number	480-17-1
3D model (JSmol)	Interactive image
ChEBI	CHEBI:11412
ChEMBL	ChEMBL124022
ChemSpider	389677
PubChem CID	440833
UNII	RAP1D6110C
CompTox Dashboard (EPA)	DTXSID70331530
- InChI: InChI=1S/C15H14O7/c16-7-4-10(19)12-11(5-7)22-15(14(21)13(12)20)6-1-2-8(17)9(18)3-6/h1-5,13-21H/t13-,14-,15+/m0/s1 Key: SBZWTSHAFILOTE-SOUVJXGZSA-N
- SMILES: C1=CC(=C(C=C1[C@@H]2[C@H]([C@H](C3=C(C=C(C=C3O2)O)O)O)O)O)O

Properties
Chemical formula	C_{15}H_{14}O_{7}
Molar mass	306.26 g/mol
- Except where otherwise noted, data are given for materials in their standard state (at 25 °C [77 °F], 100 kPa). verify (what is ?) Infobox references

Leucocyanidin is a colorless chemical compound that is a member of the class of natural products known as leucoanthocyanidins.

== Chemistry ==
(+)-Leucocyanidin can be synthesized from (+)-dihydroquercetin by reduction with sodium borohydride.

Molar equivalents of synthetic (2R,3S,4R or S)-leucocyanidin and (+)-catechin condense with exceptional rapidity at pH 5 under ambient conditions to give the all-trans-[4,8]- and [4,6]-bi-[(+)-catechins] (procyanidins B3, B6) the all-trans-[4,8:4,8]- and [4,8:4,6]-tri-[(+)-catechins] (procyanidin C2 and isomer).

== Metabolism ==
Leucocyanidin oxygenase uses leucocyanidin, 2-oxoglutarate, and O_{2} to produce cis-dihydroquercetin, trans-dihydroquercetin (taxifolin), succinate, CO_{2}, and H_{2}O.

Leucoanthocyanidin reductase (LAR or leucocyanidin reductase LCR) uses (2R,3S)-catechin, NADP^{+}, and H_{2}O to produce 2,3-trans-3,4-cis-leucocyanidin, NADPH, and H^{+}. Its gene expression has been studied in developing grape berries and grapevine leaves. Its activity has also been measured in leaves, flowers, and seeds of the legumes Medicago sativa, Lotus japonicus, Lotus uliginosus, Hedysarum sulfurescens, and Robinia pseudoacacia.

The C-4 stereochemistry of leucocyanidin substrates affects anthocyanidin synthase (ANS) products. This enzyme is an iron(II) and 2-oxoglutarate (2OG) dependent oxygenase.

== Occurrence ==
Leucoyanidin can be found in these plants:

- Aesculus hippocastanum (Horse chestnut)
- Anacardium occidentale (Cashew, acajou)
- Arachis hypogaea (peanut)
- Areca catechu (Areca nut)
- Asimina triloba (American custardapple)
- Cerasus vulgaris (Cherry)
- Cinnamomum camphora (Camphor)
- Erythroxylon coca (coca)
- Gleditsia triacanthos (Honey locust)
- Hamamelis virginiana (American Witch Hazel)
- Hippophae rhamnoides (Hippophae berry Sanddorn)
- Hordeum vulgare (Barley)
- Humulus lupulus (bine)
- Hypericum perforatum (perikon Amber)
- Laurus nobilis
- Magnolia denudata (Hsin-I Yulan-Magnolie)
- Malva sylvestris (Blue mallow)
- Musa acuminata × balbisiana (Banana)
- Nelumbo nucifera (Baladi bean)
- Pinus strobus (Eastern white pine)
- Prunus serotina ssp. serotina (black cherry)
- Psidium guajava (Common guava)
- Quercus alba (White oak)
- Quercus robur (Common oak)
- Rumex hymenosepalus (Arizona dock)
- Schinus terebinthifolius (Brazilian pepper tree)
- Terminalia arjuna (arjun)
- Terminalia catappa (Indian almond)
- Theobroma cacao (Cacao)
- Drimia maritima (Sea Squill)
- Vicia faba (bell-bean)
- Vitis vinifera (common grape vine)
- Zea mays (corn, maize)
- Ziziphus jujuba (jujube, Chinese date).
