= Leucocyanidin oxygenase =

leucocyanidin oxygenase

Identifiers
- EC no.: 1.14.20.4
- CAS no.: 180984-01-4

Databases
- IntEnz: IntEnz view
- BRENDA: BRENDA entry
- ExPASy: NiceZyme view
- KEGG: KEGG entry
- MetaCyc: metabolic pathway
- PRIAM: profile
- PDB structures: RCSB PDB PDBe PDBsum
- Gene Ontology: AmiGO / QuickGO
Search
- PMC: articles
- PubMed: articles
- NCBI: proteins

In enzymology, a leucocyanidin oxygenase (EC 1.14.20.4) is an enzyme that catalyzes the chemical reaction

leucocyanidin + 2-oxoglutarate + O_{2} $\rightleftharpoons$ cis- and trans-dihydroquercetins + succinate + CO_{2} + 2 H_{2}O

The 3 substrates of this enzyme are leucocyanidin, 2-oxoglutarate, and O_{2}, whereas its 5 products are cis-dihydroquercetin, trans-dihydroquercetin, succinate, CO_{2}, and H_{2}O.

This enzyme belongs to the family of oxidoreductases, specifically those acting on paired donors, with O2 as oxidant and incorporation or reduction of oxygen. The oxygen incorporated need not be derived from O2 with 2-oxoglutarate as one donor, and incorporation of one atom o oxygen into each donor. The systematic name of this enzyme class is leucocyanidin,2-oxoglutarate:oxygen oxidoreductase. This enzyme is also called leucoanthocyanidin dioxygenase (LDOX) or anthocyanidin synthase (ANS). This enzyme participates in flavonoid biosynthesis.

In a broader way, leucocyanidin oxygenase uses flavan-3,4-diols (leucoanthocyanidins) to produce 3-hydroxyanthocyanidins. The gene encoding the enzyme (PpLDOX) has been identified in peach and expression has been studied in Vitis vinifera.

== Structural studies ==
As of late 2007, only one structure, in Arabidopsis thaliana, has been solved for this class of enzymes, with the PDB accession code 2BRT.
