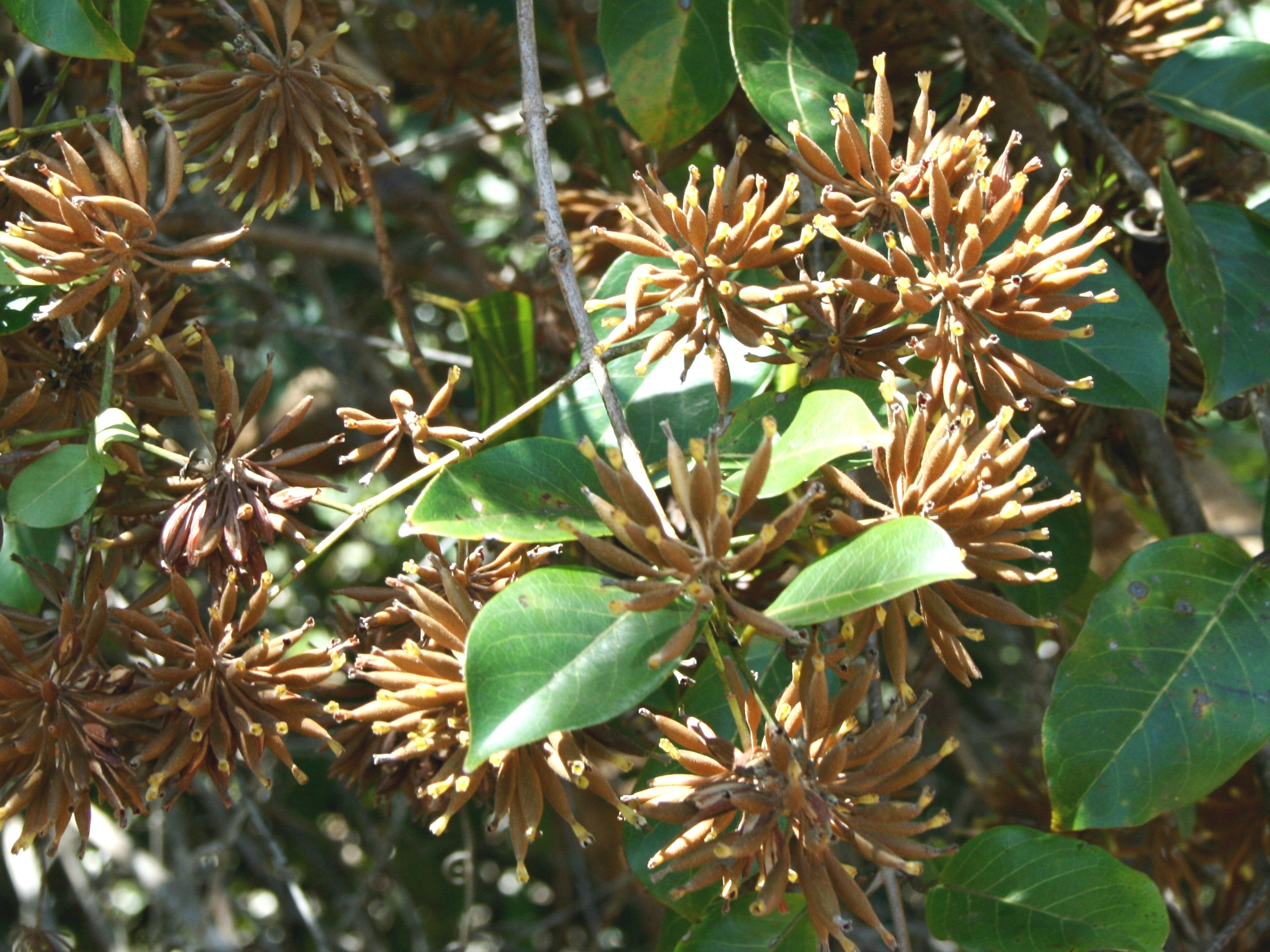

Scientific classification
- Kingdom: Plantae
- Clade: Tracheophytes
- Clade: Angiosperms
- Clade: Eudicots
- Clade: Asterids
- Order: Gentianales
- Family: Rubiaceae
- Genus: Uncaria
- Species: U. guianensis

Binomial name
- Uncaria guianensis (Aubl.) J.F.Gmel.

= Uncaria guianensis =

Species of plant

Uncaria guianensis, the cat's claw, is a plant species in the genus Uncaria found in the Amazon biome. Other names for the plant include uña de gato, Paraguayo and vincaria.

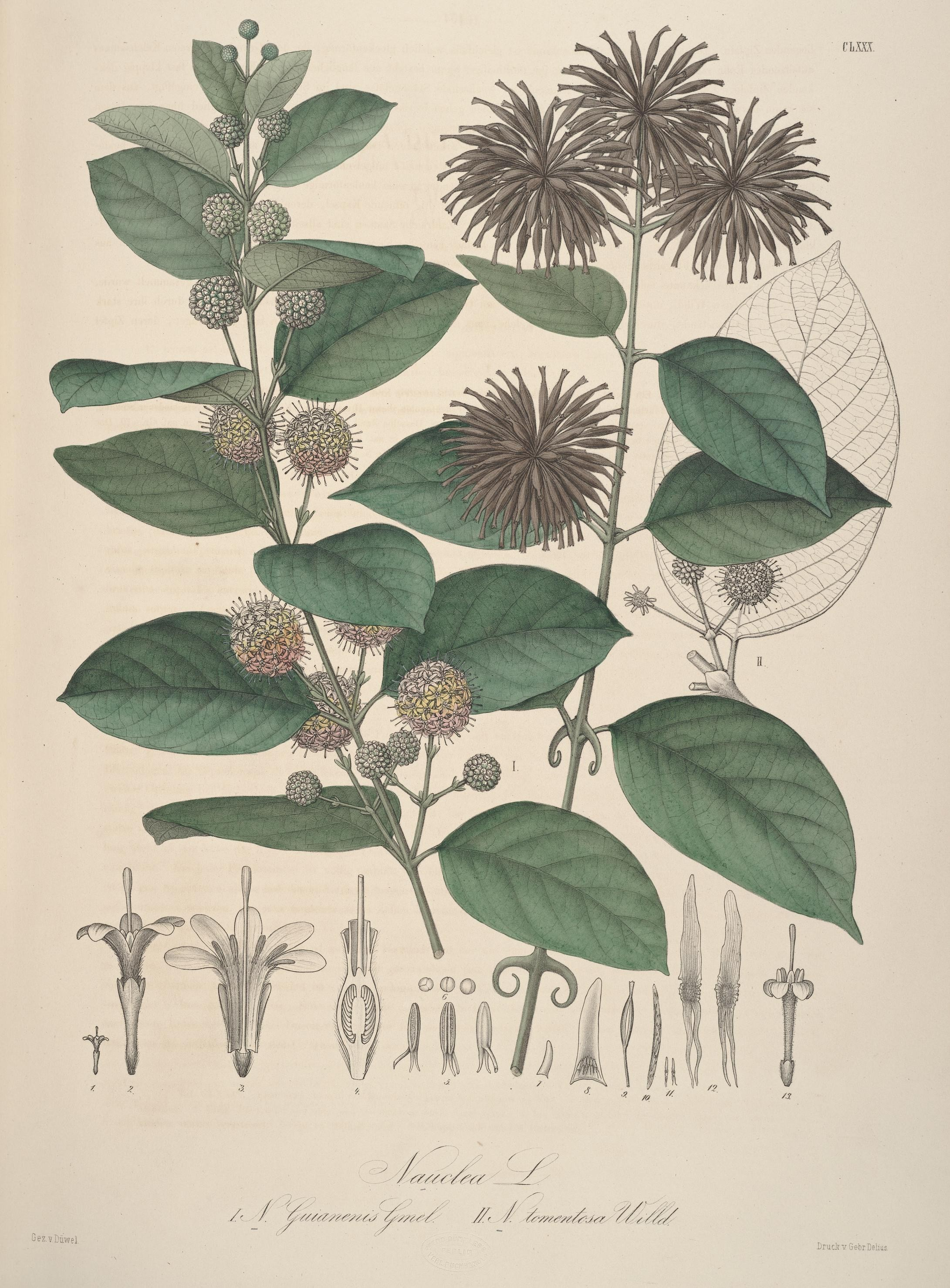
Pl. CLXXX Florae Columbiae with U. guianensis on the left.

Uncaria guianensis contains many phytochemicals ((-)-epicatechin, alkaloid, beta-Sitosterol, campesterol, campherol, catechol, catechutannic acid, chlorogenic acid, ellagic acid, gallic acid, hyperin, oleanolic acid, rutin, stigmasterol, ursolic acid) and proanthocyanidin B1 and proanthocyanidin B2, B type proanthocyanidins, in the root.
