= Hydroxyquinol 1,2-dioxygenase =

Identifiers
- EC no.: 1.13.11.37
- CAS no.: 91847-14-2

Databases
- IntEnz: IntEnz view
- BRENDA: BRENDA entry
- ExPASy: NiceZyme view
- KEGG: KEGG entry
- MetaCyc: metabolic pathway
- PRIAM: profile
- PDB structures: RCSB PDB PDBe PDBsum
- Gene Ontology: AmiGO / QuickGO
Search
- PMC: articles
- PubMed: articles
- NCBI: proteins

Hydroxyquinol 1,2-dioxygenase (EC 1.13.11.37) is an enzyme isolated from Trichosporon cutaneum that catalyzes the chemical reaction

hydroxyquinol
O_{2}
3-hydroxy-cis,cis-muconic acid

The two substrates of this enzyme are hydroxyquinol and oxygen. Its product is 3-hydroxy-cis,cis-muconic acid.

This enzyme belongs to the family of oxidoreductases, specifically those acting on single donors with O_{2} as oxidant and incorporation of two atoms of oxygen into the substrate (oxygenases). The oxygen incorporated need not be derived from O_{2}. The systematic name of this enzyme class is benzene-1,2,4-triol:oxygen 1,2-oxidoreductase (decyclizing). This enzyme is also called hydroxyquinol dioxygenase. This enzyme participates in benzoate degradation via hydroxylation and 1,4-dichlorobenzene degradation. It employs one cofactor, iron.

== Structural studies ==
As of late 2007, only one structure has been solved for this class of enzymes, with the PDB accession code 1TMX.
