= Procyanidin dimer =

Proanthocyanidin dimers are a specific type of proanthocyanidin, which are a class of flavanoids. They are oligomers of flavan-3-ols.

- Dimeric B-type proanthocyanidins
- Dimeric A-type proanthocyanidins
