= Silver trifluoromethanesulfonate =

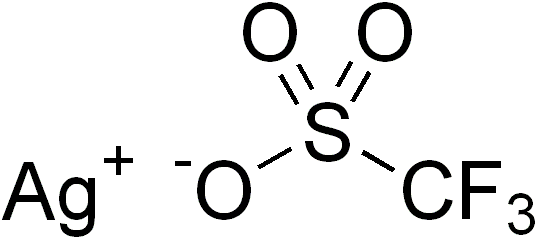

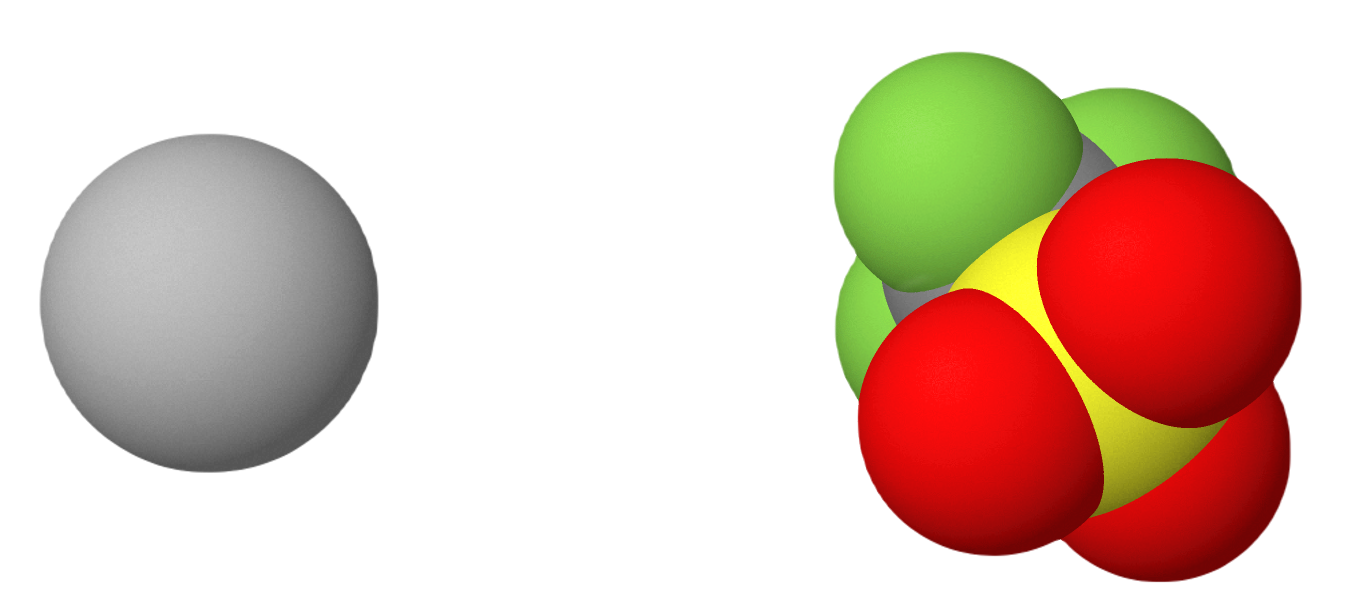

Names
- IUPAC name silver trifluoromethanesulfonate
- Other names Silver triflate

Identifiers
CAS Number	2923-28-6changed
3D model (JSmol)	Interactive image
Abbreviations	AgOTf
ChemSpider	68705
ECHA InfoCard	100.018.985
EC Number	220-882-2
PubChem CID	76223
UNII	UK2MGY9YSF
CompTox Dashboard (EPA)	DTXSID5062716
- InChI: InChI=1S/CHF3O3S.Ag/c2-1(3,4)8(5,6)7;/h(H,5,6,7);/q;+1/p-1 Key: QRUBYZBWAOOHSV-UHFFFAOYSA-M
- SMILES: C(F)(F)(F)S(=O)(=O)[O-].[Ag+]

Properties
Chemical formula	CF_{3}SO_{3}Ag
Molar mass	256.937 g/mol
Odor	odorless
Melting point	286 °C (547 °F; 559 K)
Solubility in water	soluble

Hazards
- GHS labelling
Pictograms	(GHS05: Corrosive) (GHS07: Exclamation mark)
Signal word	Danger
Hazard statements	H315, H319, H335
Precautionary statements	P260, P264, P271, P280, P301+P330+P331, P302+P352, P303+P361+P353, P304+P340, P305+P351+P338, P310, P312, P321, P332+P313, P337+P313, P362, P363, P403+P233, P405, P501
NFPA 704 (fire diamond)	1 0 0
Safety data sheet (SDS)	Oxford MSDS
- Except where otherwise noted, data are given for materials in their standard state (at 25 °C [77 °F], 100 kPa). verify (what is ?) Infobox references

Silver trifluoromethanesulfonate, or silver triflate is the triflate (CF_{3}SO_{3}^{−}) salt of Ag^{+}. It is a white or colorless solid that is soluble in water and some organic solvents including, benzene. It is a reagent used in the synthesis of organic and inorganic triflates.

== Synthesis ==
An early preparation method starts from the barium salt of trifluoromethanesulfonic acid (TfOH), from which the free TfOH is formed with dilute sulfuric acid, which is then neutralized with silver carbonate (Ag_{2}CO_{3}).

$$\ce{Ba^2+[{^-}OSO2CF3]2 ->[\ce{H2SO4}][-\ce{BaSO4}] CF3SO2OH ->[\ce{Ag2CO3}] CF3SO2O^- Ag+}$$

The silver triflate is thereby obtained in a yield of 95% and can be recrystallized from benzene/tetrachloromethane or ether/tetrachloromethane for purification.

In an improved version by George Whitesides, dilute TfOH is reacted with silver(I)oxide (Ag_{2}O), which produces AgOTf in 98% yield.

== Reactions ==
It is used to prepare alkyl triflates from alkyl halides:

CF_{3}SO_{2}OAg + RX → CF_{3}SO_{2}OR + AgX (X = iodide usually)

In coordination chemistry, the salt is also useful to replace halide ligands with the more labile triflate ligand. For example, bromopentacarbonylrhenium can be converted to the more labile derivative using silver triflate:

CF_{3}SO_{2}OAg + BrRe(CO)_{5} → CF_{3}SO_{2}ORe(CO)_{5} + AgBr
