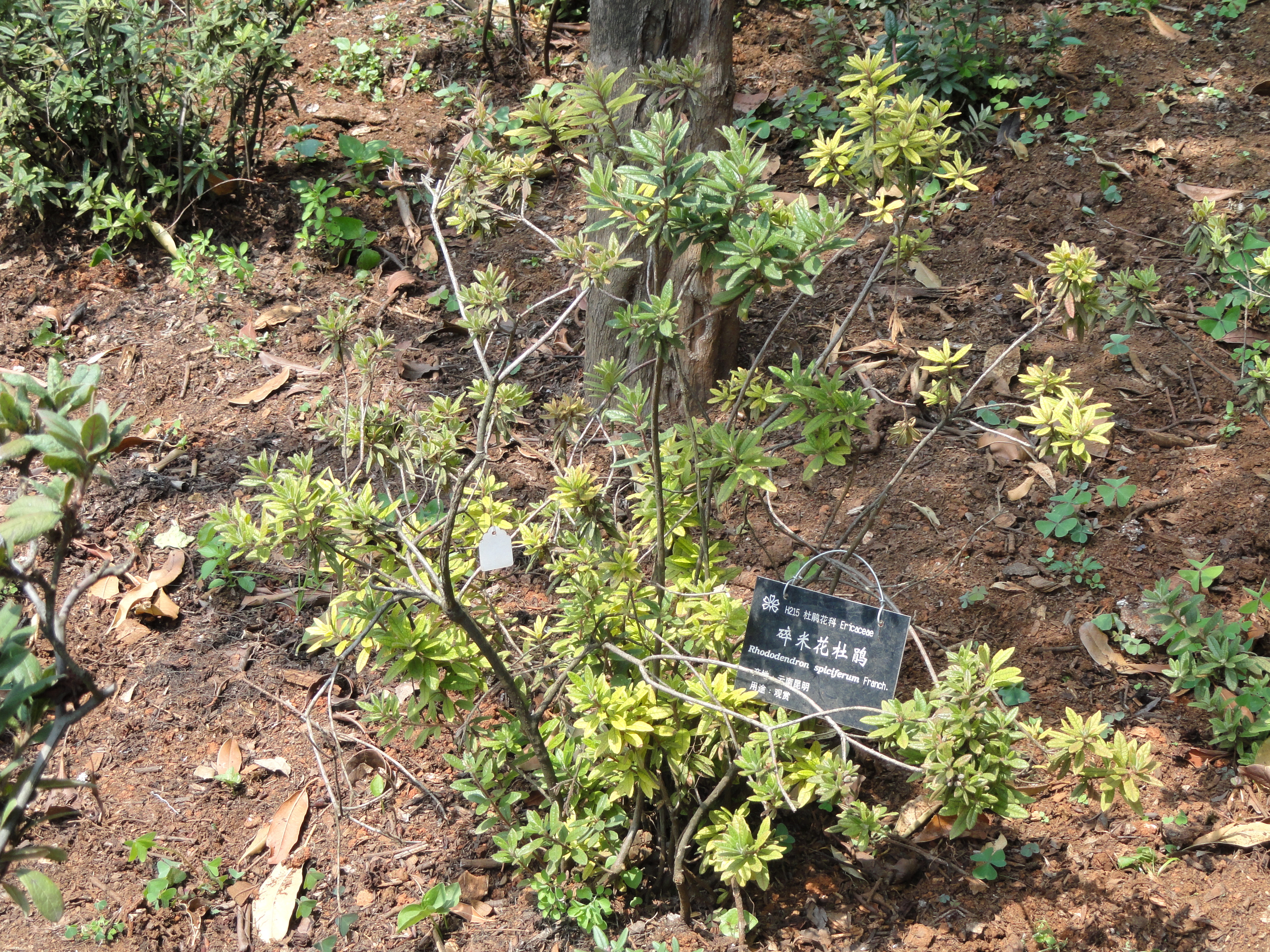

Scientific classification
- Kingdom: Plantae
- Clade: Tracheophytes
- Clade: Angiosperms
- Clade: Eudicots
- Clade: Asterids
- Order: Ericales
- Family: Ericaceae
- Genus: Rhododendron
- Species: R. spiciferum

Binomial name
- Rhododendron spiciferum Franch.

= Rhododendron spiciferum =

Species of plant

Rhododendron spiciferum (碎米花) is a rhododendron species native to western Guizhou and Yunnan, China, where it grows at altitudes of 800–1,900 m (2,600–6,200 ft). It is a small evergreen shrub growing to 20–60 cm (7.9–23.6 in) in height, with leaves that are narrowly oblong or oblong-lanceolate, 1.2–4 by 0.4–1.2 cm in size. The flowers are pink or rarely white.
