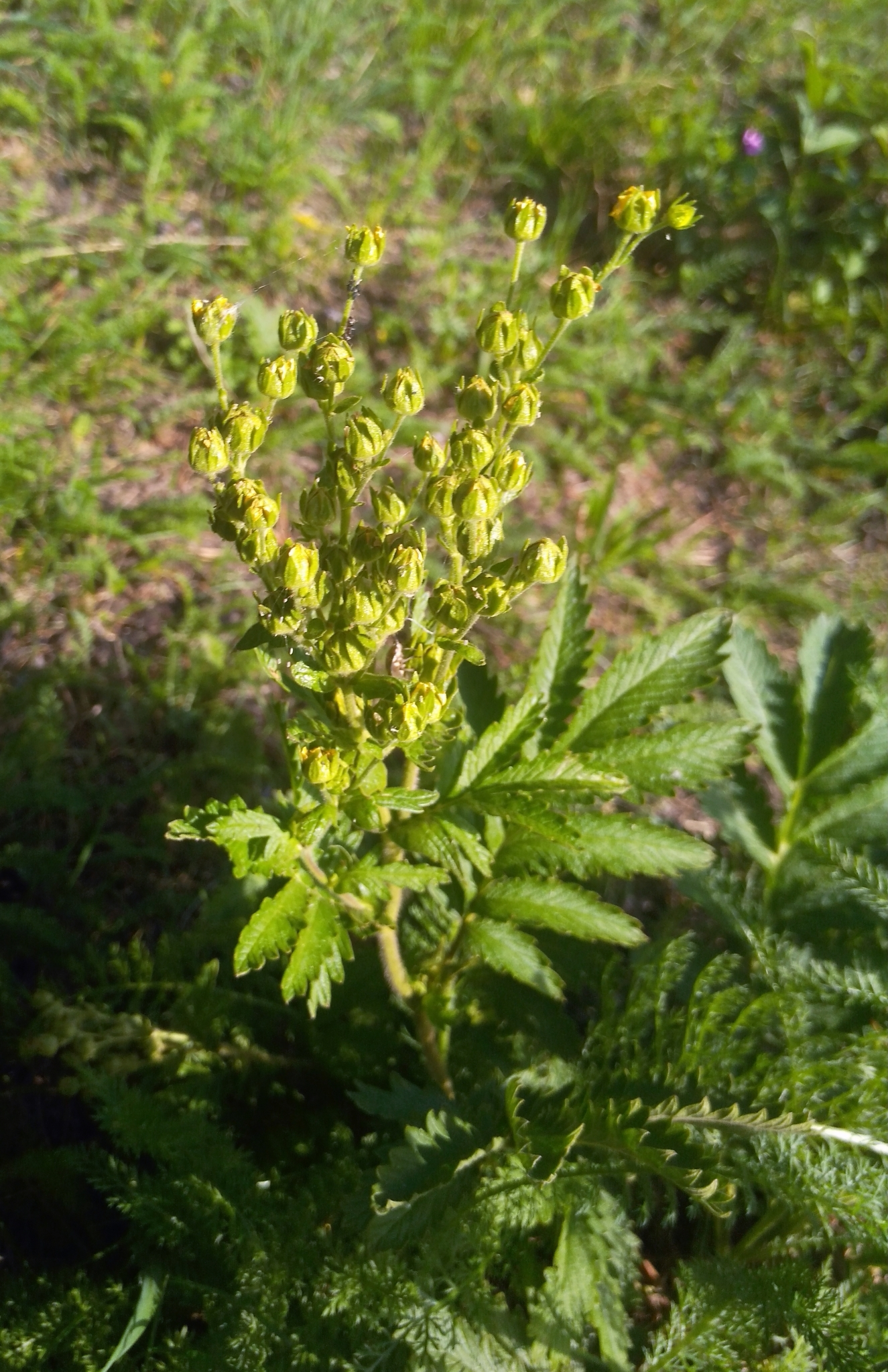

Scientific classification
- Kingdom: Plantae
- Clade: Tracheophytes
- Clade: Angiosperms
- Clade: Eudicots
- Clade: Rosids
- Order: Rosales
- Family: Rosaceae
- Genus: Potentilla
- Species: P. longifolia

Binomial name
- Potentilla longifolia Willd. ex Schltdl. 1816

Synonyms
- Potentilla viscosa Donn ex Lehm.

= Potentilla longifolia =

Species of flowering plant

Potentilla longifolia is a species of plant in the family Rosaceae. It is found in Russia and Mongolia.
