= DPPH =

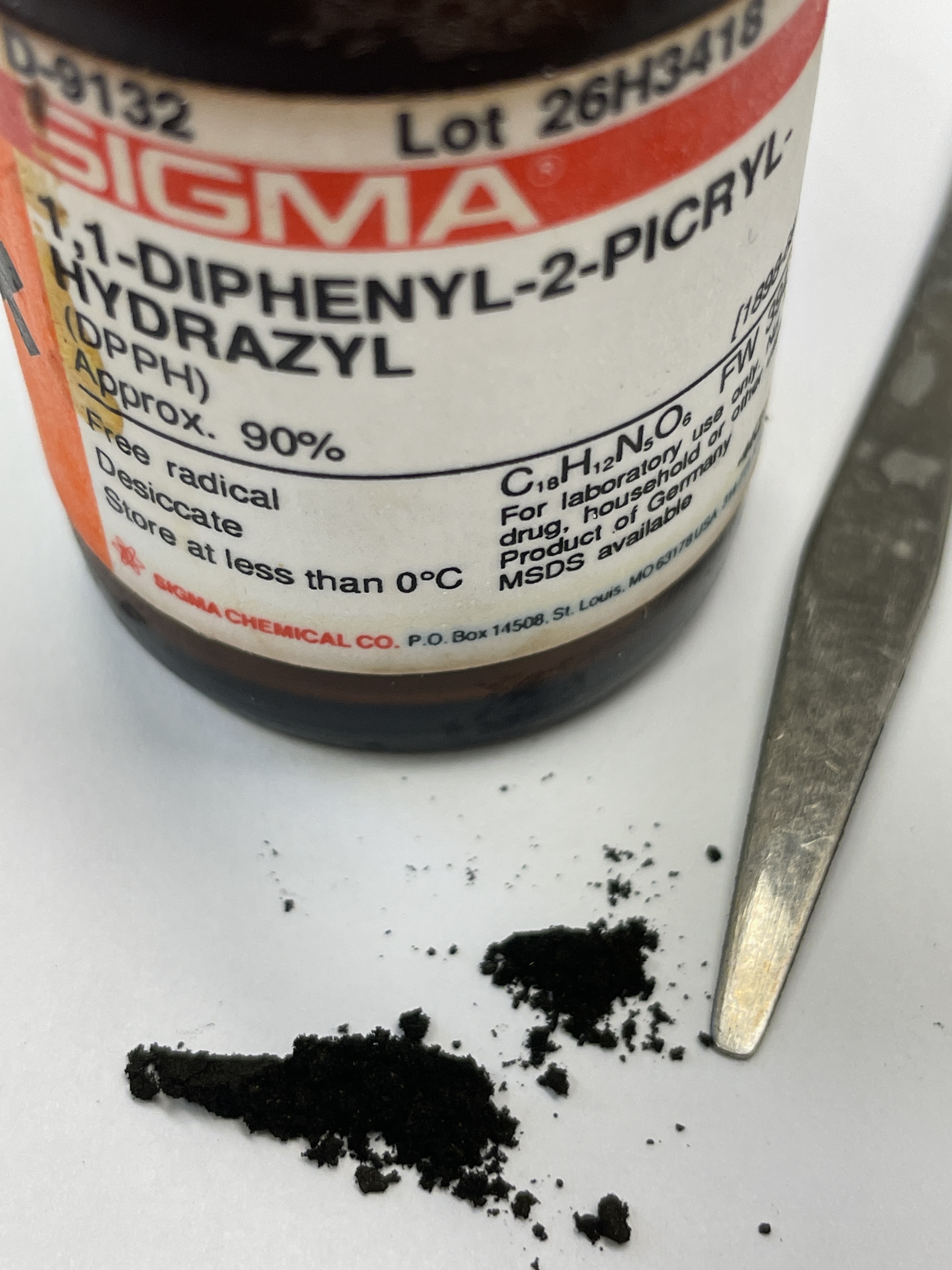

Names
- Preferred IUPAC name 2,2-Diphenyl-1-(2,4,6-trinitrophenyl)hydrazin-1-yl
- Other names 2,2-Diphenyl-1-picrylhydrazyl; 1,1-Diphenyl-2-picrylhydrazyl radical 2,2-Diphenyl-1-(2,4,6-trinitrophenyl)hydrazyl; Diphenylpicrylhydrazyl

Identifiers
| CAS Number | 1898-66-4 |
| 3D model (JSmol) | Interactive image |
| Abbreviations | DPPH |
| ChemSpider | 2016757 |
| ECHA InfoCard | 100.015.993 |
| PubChem CID | 74358 |
| UNII | DFD3H4VGDH |
| CompTox Dashboard (EPA) | DTXSID8061896 |
- InChI: InChI=1S/C18H12N5O6/c24-21(25)15-11-16(22(26)27)18(17(12-15)23(28)29)19-20(13-7-3-1-4-8-13)14-9-5-2-6-10-14/h1-12H Key: HHEAADYXPMHMCT-UHFFFAOYSA-N; InChI=1/C18H13N5O6/c24-21(25)15-11-16(22(26)27)18(17(12-15)23(28)29)19-20(13-7-3-1-4-8-13)14-9-5-2-6-10-14/h1-12,19H Key: WCBPJVKVIMMEQC-UHFFFAOYAG; InChI=1/C18H12N5O6/c24-21(25)15-11-16(22(26)27)18(17(12-15)23(28)29)19-20(13-7-3-1-4-8-13)14-9-5-2-6-10-14/h1-12H Key: HHEAADYXPMHMCT-UHFFFAOYAG
- SMILES: c1ccc(cc1)N(c2ccccc2)[N]c3c(cc(cc3[N+](=O)[O-])[N+](=O)[O-])[N+](=O)[O-]

Properties
| Chemical formula | C_{18}H_{12}N_{5}O_{6} |
| Molar mass | 394.323 g·mol^{−1} |
| Appearance | Black to green powder, purple in solution |
| Density | 1.4 g/cm^{3} |
| Melting point | 135 °C (275 °F; 408 K) (decomposes) |
| Solubility in water | insoluble |
| Solubility in methanol | 10 mg/mL |

Hazards
| NFPA 704 (fire diamond) | 0 1 0 |
| Safety data sheet (SDS) | MSDS |
- Except where otherwise noted, data are given for materials in their standard state (at 25 °C [77 °F], 100 kPa). verify (what is ?) Infobox references

DPPH (2,2-diphenyl-1-picrylhydrazyl) is an organic chemical compound. It is a dark-colored crystalline powder composed of stable free radical molecules. DPPH has two major applications, both in laboratory research: one is a monitor of chemical reactions involving radicals, most notably it is a common antioxidant assay, and another is a standard of the position and intensity of electron paramagnetic resonance signals.

== Properties and applications ==
DPPH has several crystalline forms which differ by the lattice symmetry and melting point. The commercial powder is a mixture of phases which melts at ~130 °C. DPPH-I (m.p. 106 °C) is orthorhombic, DPPH-II (m.p. 137 °C) is amorphous and DPPH-III (m.p. 128–129 °C) is triclinic.

DPPH is a well-known radical and a trap ("scavenger") for other radicals. Therefore, rate reduction of a chemical reaction upon addition of DPPH is used as an indicator of the radical nature of that reaction. Because of a strong absorption band centered at about 520 nm, the DPPH radical has a deep violet color in solution, and it becomes colorless or pale yellow when neutralized. This property allows visual monitoring of the reaction, and the number of initial radicals can be counted from the change in the optical absorption at 520 nm or in the EPR signal of the DPPH.

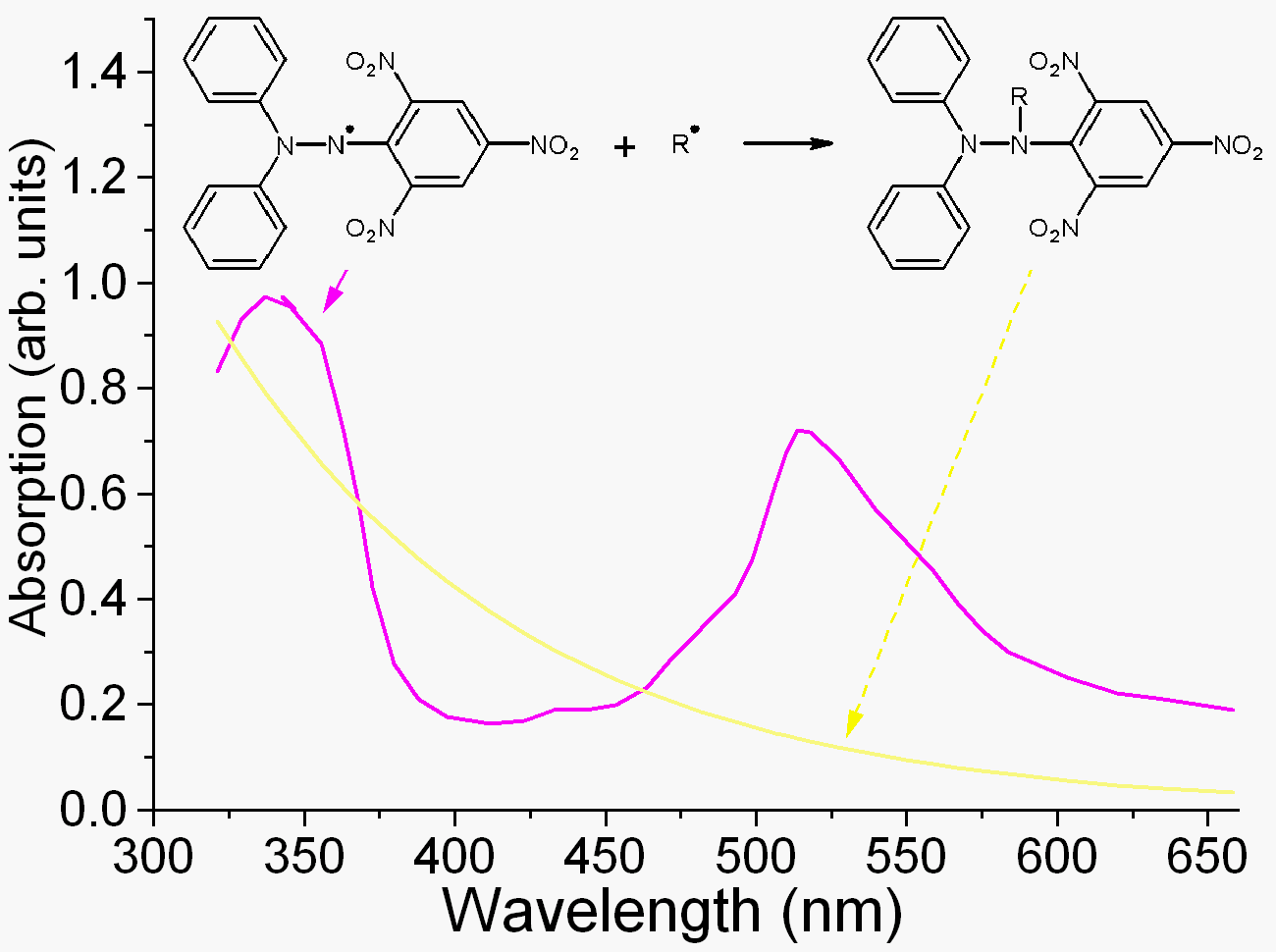

Because DPPH is an efficient radical trap, it is also a strong inhibitor of radical-mediated polymerization.

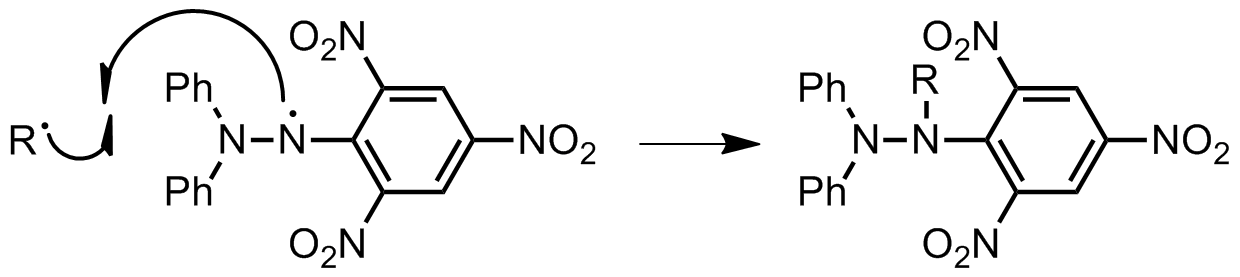
Inhibition of polymer chain, R, by DPPH.

As a stable and well-characterized solid radical source, DPPH is the traditional and perhaps the most popular standard of the position (g-marker) and intensity of electron paramagnetic resonance (EPR) signals – the number of radicals for a freshly prepared sample can be determined by weighing and the EPR splitting factor for DPPH is calibrated at g = 2.0036. DPPH signal is convenient by that it is normally concentrated in a single line, whose intensity increases linearly with the square root of microwave power in the wider power range. The dilute nature of the DPPH radicals (one unpaired spin per 41 atoms) results in a relatively small linewidth (1.5–4.7 G). The linewidth may however increase if solvent molecules remain in the crystal and if measurements are performed with a high-frequency EPR setup (~200 GHz), where the slight g-anisotropy of DPPH becomes detectable.

Whereas DPPH is normally a paramagnetic solid, it transforms into an antiferromagnetic state upon cooling to very low temperatures of the order 0.3 K. This phenomenon was first reported by Alexander Prokhorov in 1963.
