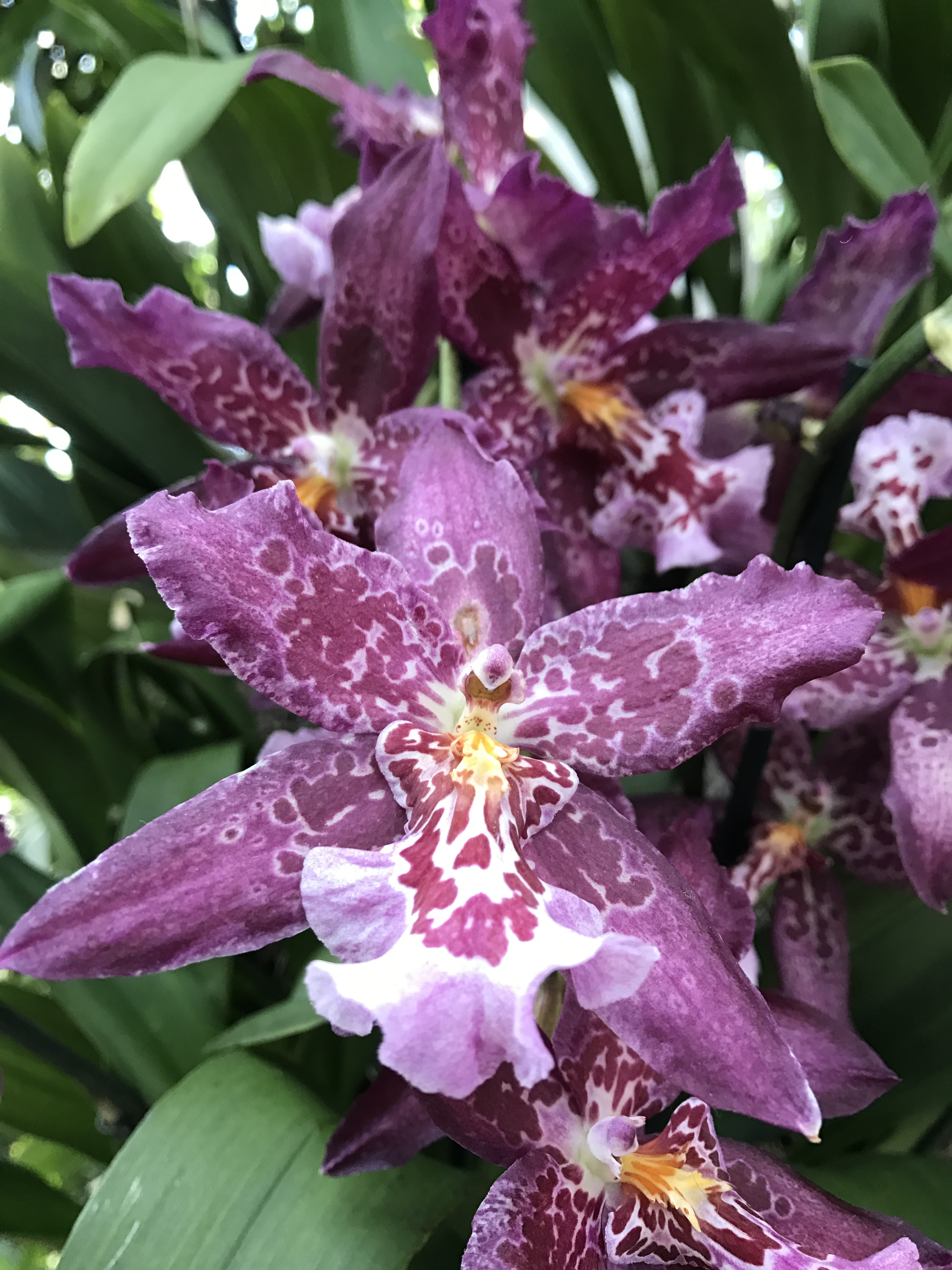

Scientific classification
- Kingdom: Plantae
- Clade: Tracheophytes
- Clade: Angiosperms
- Clade: Monocots
- Order: Asparagales
- Family: Orchidaceae
- Subfamily: Epidendroideae
- Tribe: Cymbidieae
- Subtribe: Oncidiinae
- Genus: × Aliceara hort.

= × Aliceara =

Genus of flowering plants

× Aliceara, abbreviated Alcra. in the horticultural trade, is the nothogenus for intergeneric hybrids between three orchid genera (Brassia × Miltonia × Oncidium). The name Cambria is used in the horticultural trade. Some other nothogenus names which were created for hybrids involving the then-recognized genera Cochlioda and Odontoglossum, regarded as synonyms of Oncidium as of May 2026, are now equivalent to × Aliceara. These include × Bakerara, × Beallara and × Degarmoara.

== Description ==
Plants of the genus × Aliceara have relatively stretched pseudobulbs, from which the leaves and the long floral stem develop. The inflorescences have from three to seven flowers, in a large variety of colors and shapes. At the end of the flowering period the orchid produces a new pseudobulb that can create a new plant.

== Taxonomy ==
The name "× Cambria" is used commercially for hybrids among genera of subtribe Oncidiinae, initially including the genera Cochlioda and Odontoglossum. These two genera have been merged into Oncidium, so the nothogenus × Aliceara applies.

Other related names affected by the merger into Oncidium include:

- × Bakerara (abbreviated Bak. in the horticultural trade) = Brassia × Miltonia × Oncidium × Odontoglossum, now just Brassia × Miltonia × Oncidium = × Aliceara
- × Beallara (abbreviated Bllra. in the horticultural trade) = Brassia × Cochlioda × Miltonia × Odontoglossum, now just Brassia × Miltonia × Oncidium = × Aliceara
- × Colmanara = Miltonia × Odontoglossum × Oncidium, now just Miltonia × Oncidium = × Miltonidium
- × Degarmoara (abbreviated Dgmra. in the horticultural trade) = Brassia × Miltonia × Odontoglossum, now Brassia × Miltonia × Oncidium = × Aliceara
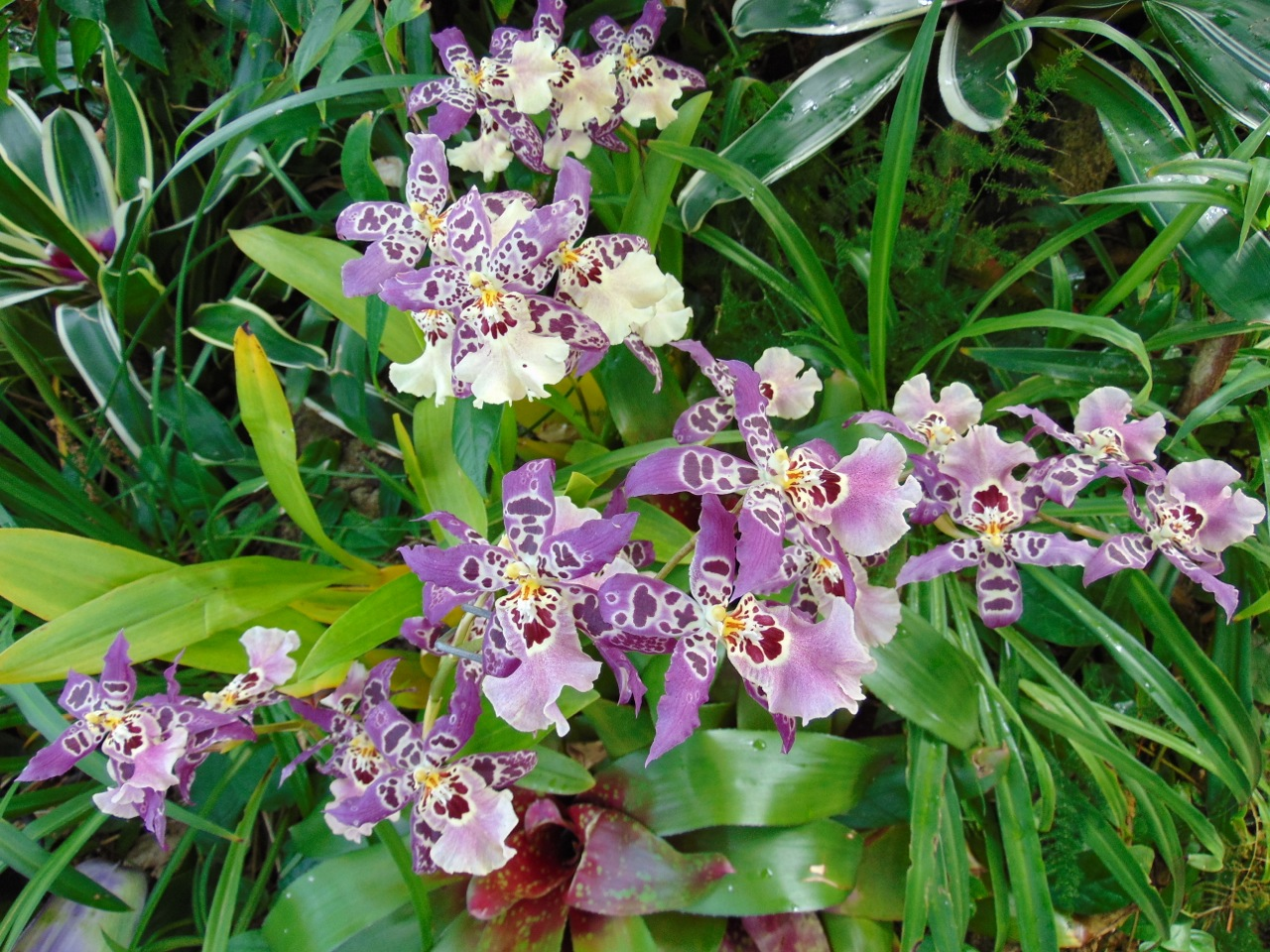
× Aliceara Clownish 'Cotton Candy', formerly placed in × Bakerara

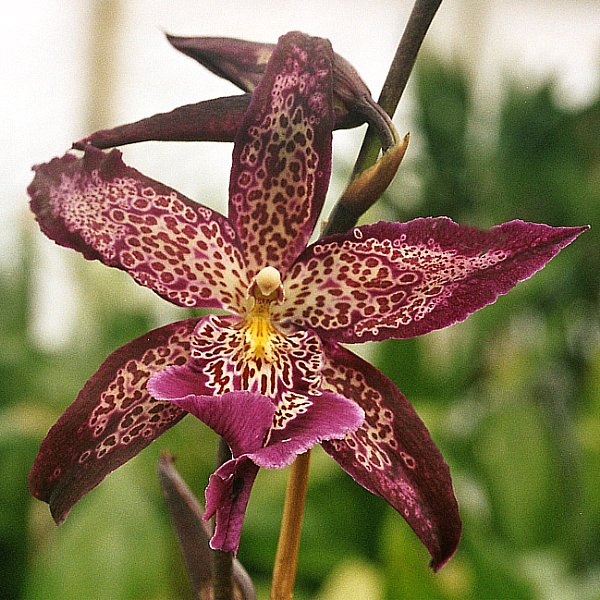
× Aliceara Marfitch 'Howards Dream', formerly placed in × Beallara

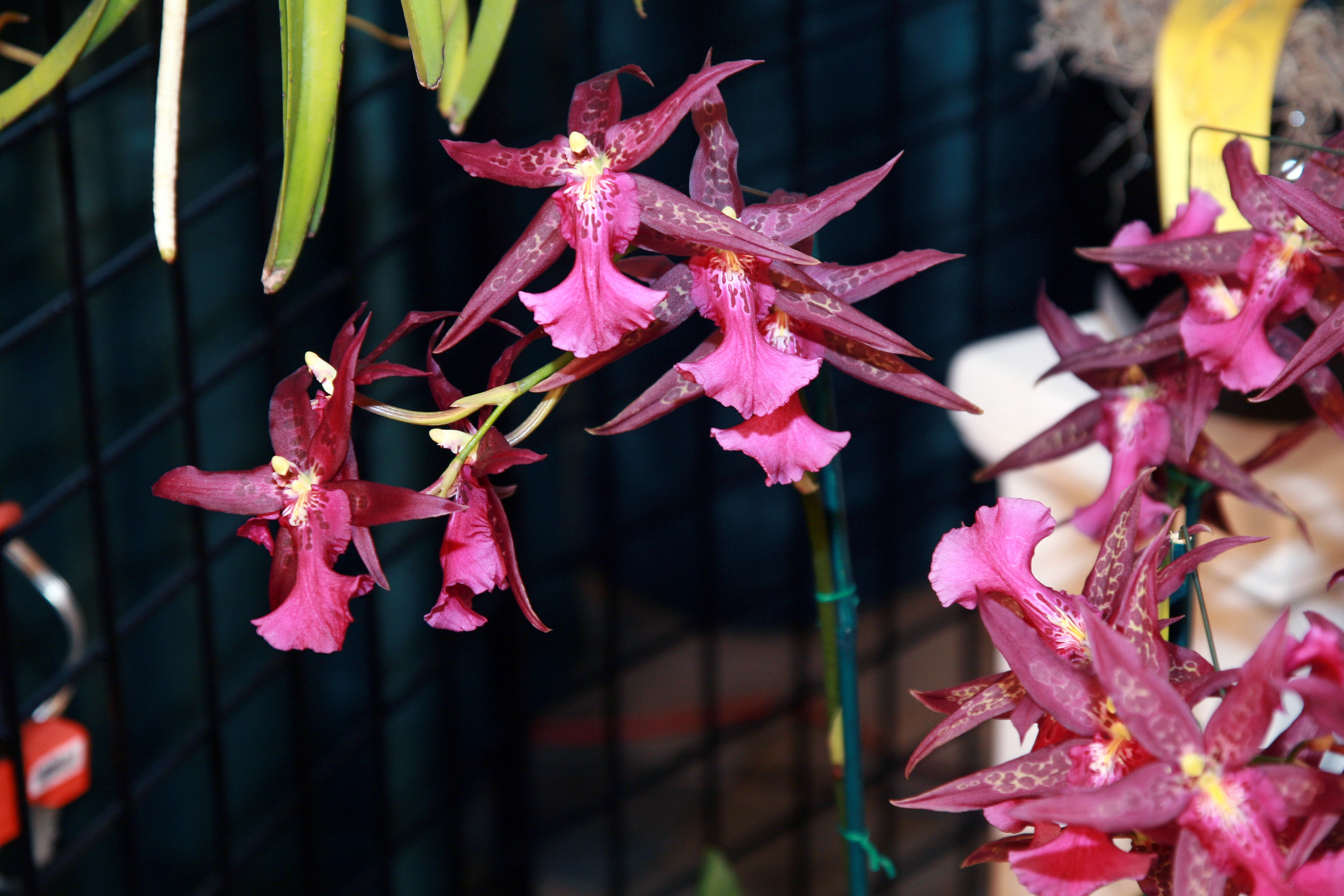
× Aliceara Hani 'Star of Unicorn', formerly placed in × Degarmoara
