= × Degarmoara =

Genus of orchids

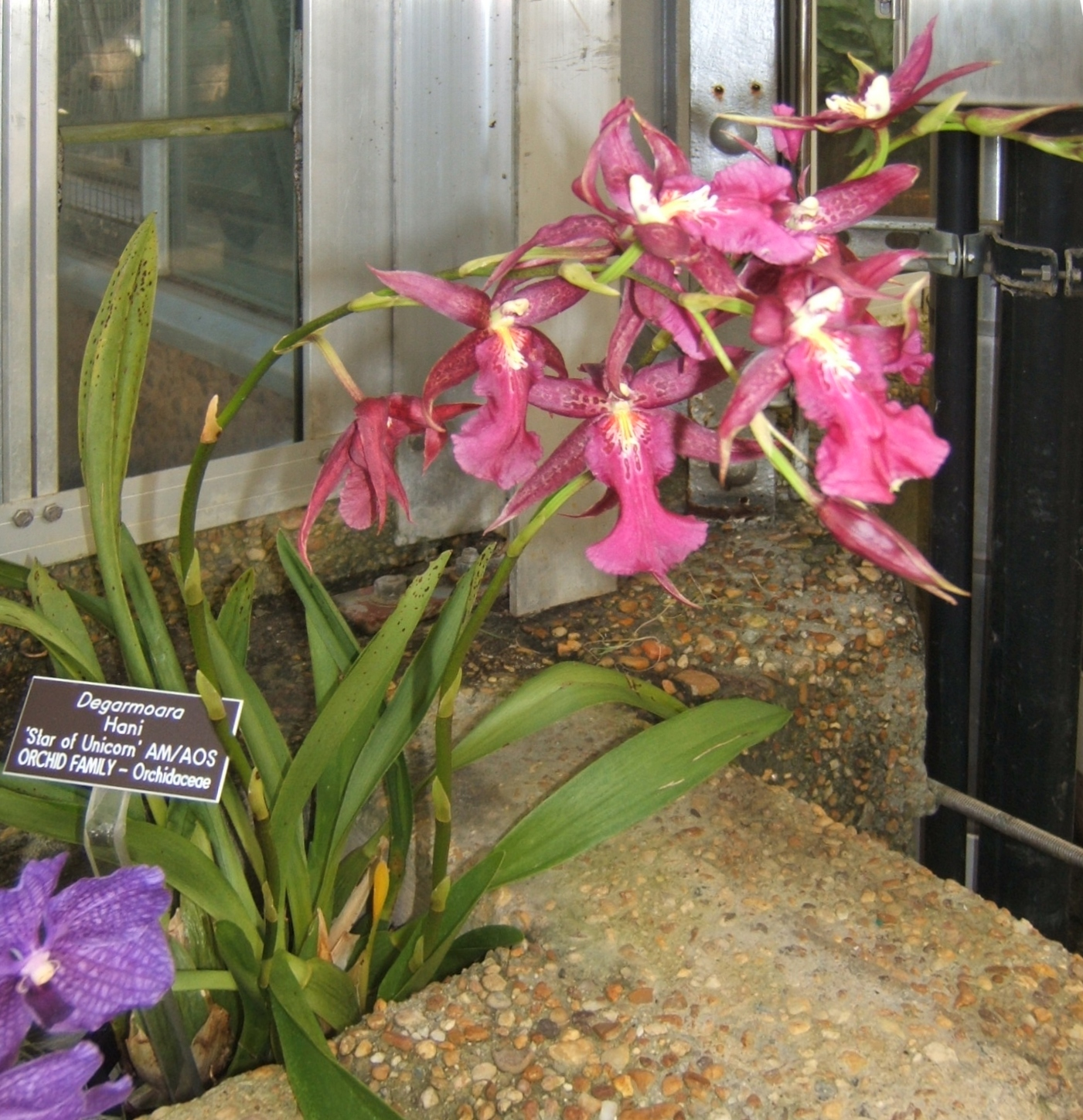
× Aliceara formerly treated as x Degarmoara Hani 'Star of Unicorn'

× Degarmoara, abbreviated Dgmra. in the horticultural trade, was the nothogenus comprising intergeneric hybrids between the orchid genera Brassia, Miltonia and Odontoglossum (Brs. x Milt. x Odm.). As of May 2026, Odontoglossum was treated as a synonym of Oncidium, so that x Degarmoara had the same parents as the nothogenus × Aliceara. The RHS Orchid register does not register Degarmoara anymore.
