= Purple chokeberry =

Purple chokeberry is a common name for several plants and may refer to:

- Aronia prunifolia, native to eastern North America
- Malus floribunda, native to eastern Asia and cultivated as an ornamental
