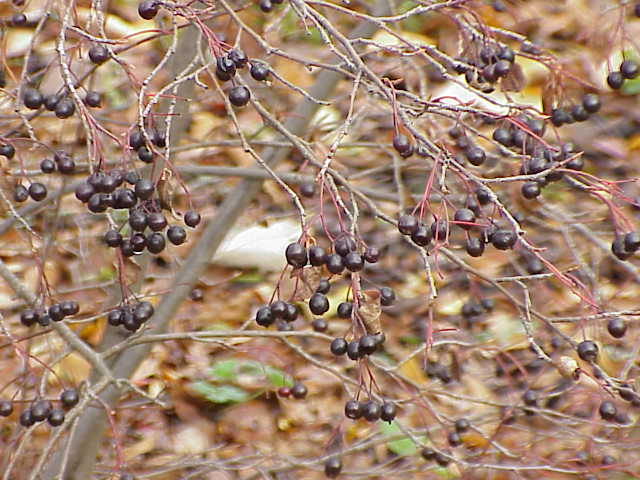

Scientific classification
- Kingdom: Plantae
- Clade: Tracheophytes
- Clade: Angiosperms
- Clade: Eudicots
- Clade: Rosids
- Order: Rosales
- Family: Rosaceae
- Genus: Aronia
- Species: A. × prunifolia

Binomial name
- Aronia × prunifolia (Marshall) Rehder 1938

Synonyms
- Synonymy: Mespilus prunifolia Marshall 1785; Adenorachis atropurpurea (Britton) Nieuwl.; Aronia atropurpurea Britton; Aronia floribunda (Lindl.) Sweet; Crataegus arbutifolia Lam.; Pyrus atropurpurea (Britton) L.H.Bailey; Pyrus floribunda Lindl.

= Aronia prunifolia =

Species of flowering plant

Aronia × prunifolia, called the purple chokeberry, is a North American hybrid shrub of Aronia arbutifolia × Aronia melanocarpa in the rose family. It is native to eastern Canada and to the eastern and central United States, from Nova Scotia west to Ontario and Wisconsin, south as far as western South Carolina with an isolated population reported in southern Alabama.

Some authors consider this to be a hybrid rather than a full-fledged species but it does grow in places where neither parent is present (most of Michigan for example). This independence merits acceptance as a full species. This sort of thing is not unusual; many species of plants originated as hybrids.

Aronia × prunifolia is a branching shrub forming clumps by means of stems forming from the roots. Flowers are white or pink, producing purple fruits. The fruits are very astringent - widely considered unpalatable - when raw, but can be used to make jams and jellies. The common name "Chokeberry" refers to the phenomenon that tasting the raw fruits can cause choking.
