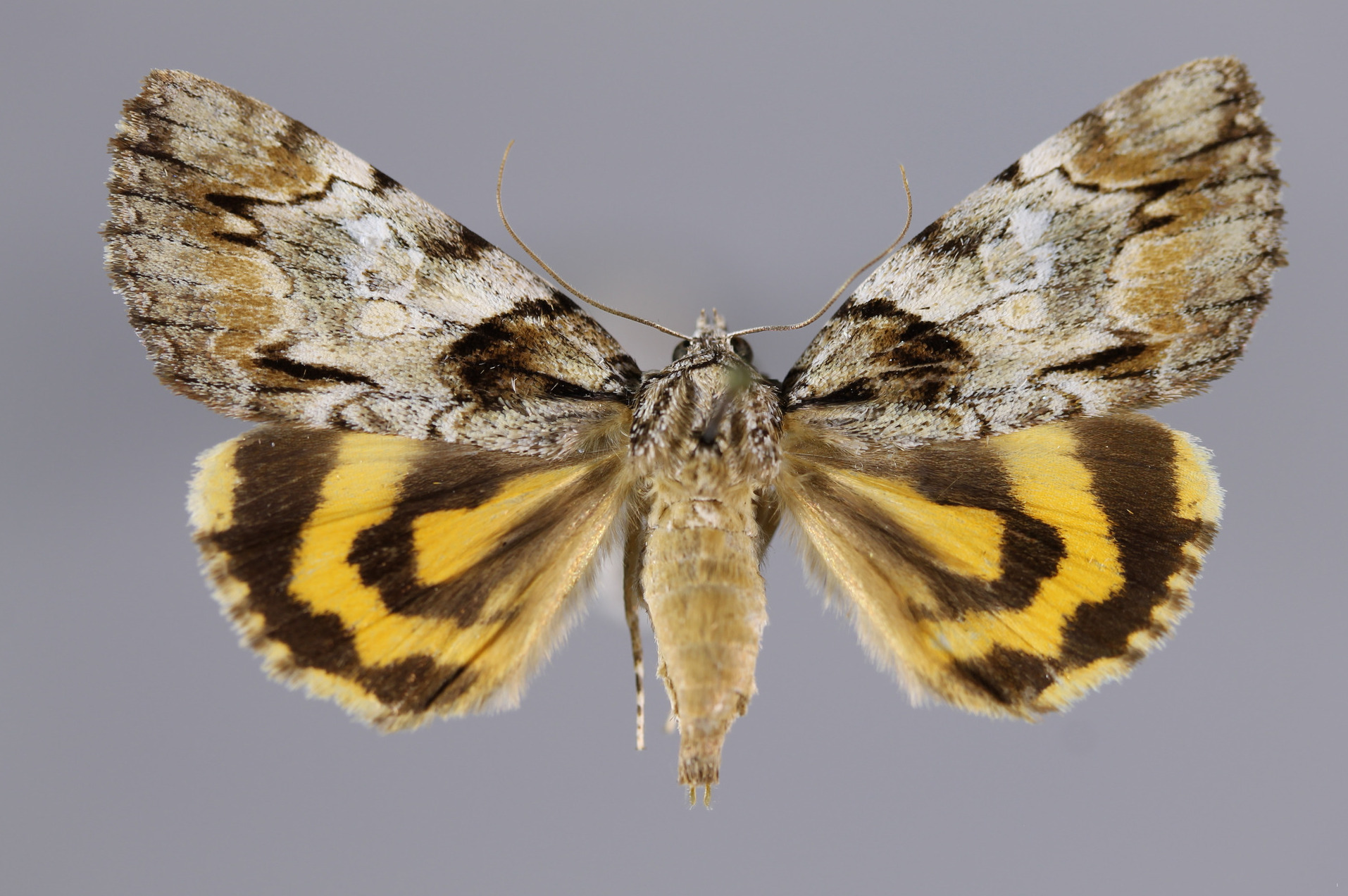

Scientific classification
- Kingdom: Animalia
- Phylum: Arthropoda
- Class: Insecta
- Order: Lepidoptera
- Superfamily: Noctuoidea
- Family: Erebidae
- Genus: Catocala
- Species: C. pretiosa

Binomial name
- Catocala pretiosa Lintner, 1876

Synonyms
- Catocala bridwelli Brower, 1976

= Catocala pretiosa =

Precious underwing

Species of moth

Catocala pretiosa, the precious underwing, is a moth of the family Erebidae. The species was first described by Joseph Albert Lintner in 1876. It was included in Catocala crataegi by many authors, but recently it has been revalidated as a distinct species. The subspecies of pretiosa is listed as a species of special concern and believed extirpated in the US state of Connecticut.

It is found from Massachusetts, Connecticut, and New Jersey west to Pennsylvania and south to Virginia and North Carolina and west to Tennessee into Louisiana and Oklahoma. Subspecies texarkana is found from Florida to Texas.

The wingspan is 40–50 mm. Adults are on wing from May to June. There is probably one generation per year.

Larvae feed on Amelanchier, Malus, Photinia arbutifolia, and Prunus maritima. The larvae of the pretiosa subspecies feeds on Amelanchier, Malus, and Aronia arbutifolia.

== Subspecies ==
- Catocala pretiosa pretiosa
- Catocala pretiosa texarkana Brower, 1976 – Texarkana underwing (Florida to Texas)
