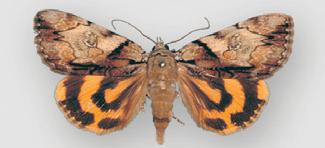

Scientific classification
- Kingdom: Animalia
- Phylum: Arthropoda
- Class: Insecta
- Order: Lepidoptera
- Superfamily: Noctuoidea
- Family: Erebidae
- Genus: Catocala
- Species: C. crataegi

Binomial name
- Catocala crataegi Saunders, 1876

= Catocala crataegi =

Species of moth

Catocala crataegi, the hawthorn underwing or chokeberry underwing, is a moth of the family Erebidae. It is found from Ontario and Quebec to Prince Edward Island south from Maine through Connecticut to Georgia and west to Arkansas and north to Minnesota.

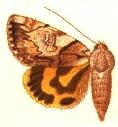
Illustration

Catocala pretiosa was considered a synonym of Catocala crataegi for some time, but was revised as valid species by Schweitzer in 1982.

The wingspan is 40–50 mm. Adults are on wing from June to August depending on the location. There is probably one generation per year.

The larvae feed on Crataegus and Pyrus malus.
