= × Beallara =

Genus of flowering plants

× Beallara, abbreviated Bllra. in the horticultural trade, was the nothogenus for intergeneric hybrids between the orchid genera Brassia, Cochlioda, Miltonia and Odontoglossum (Brs. x Cda. x Milt. x Odm.). As Cochlioda and Odontoglossum have been synonymized with Oncidium, the current genera involved are Brassia x Miltonia × Oncidium, so the correct genus name is × Aliceara.

== Description ==
This plant has a branched stem that grows to about 150 centimetres (59 in) in height. The leaves are elongated and lanceolate, reaching about 60 centimetres (24 in) of length. The flowers are numerous, about 14 to 16, and last long, between 20 and 30 days. It has fleshy large pseudobulbs. These orchids are commonly cultivated in greenhouses for ornamental purposes, resulting in a huge variety of cultivars of different colors.

== Gallery ==
Hybrids that have been placed in × Beallara

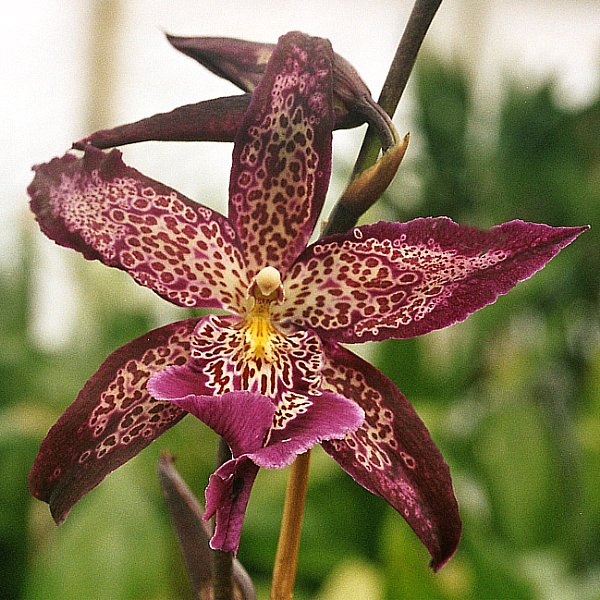
Marfitch 'Howard's Dream'

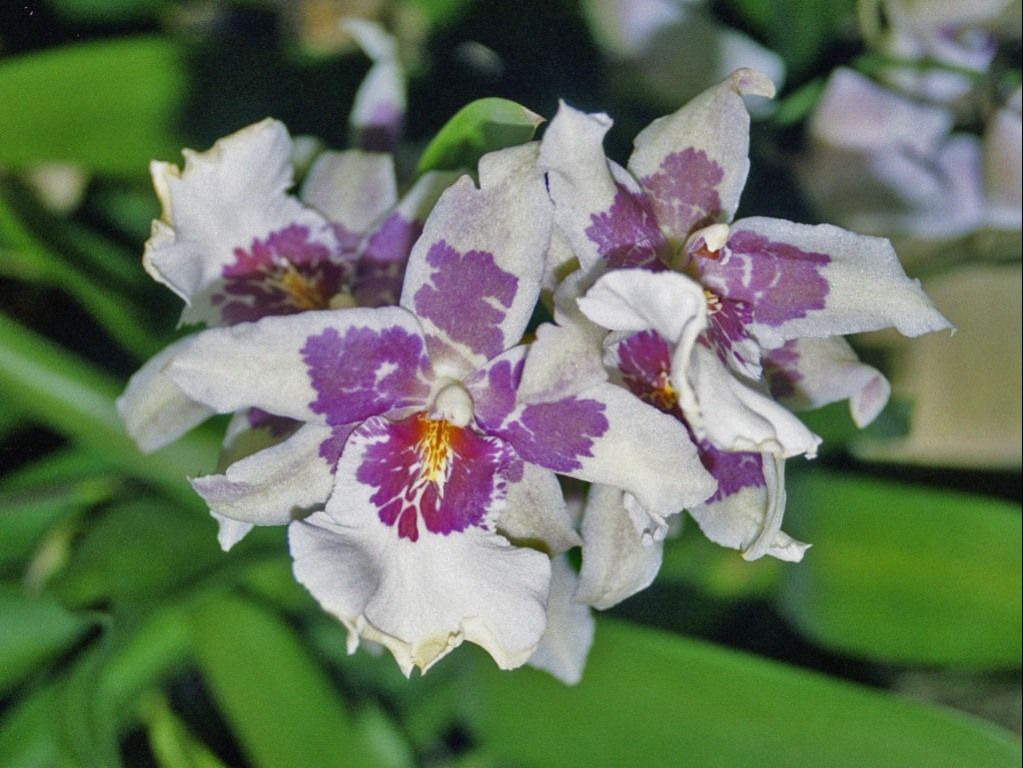
'Tahoma Glacier'

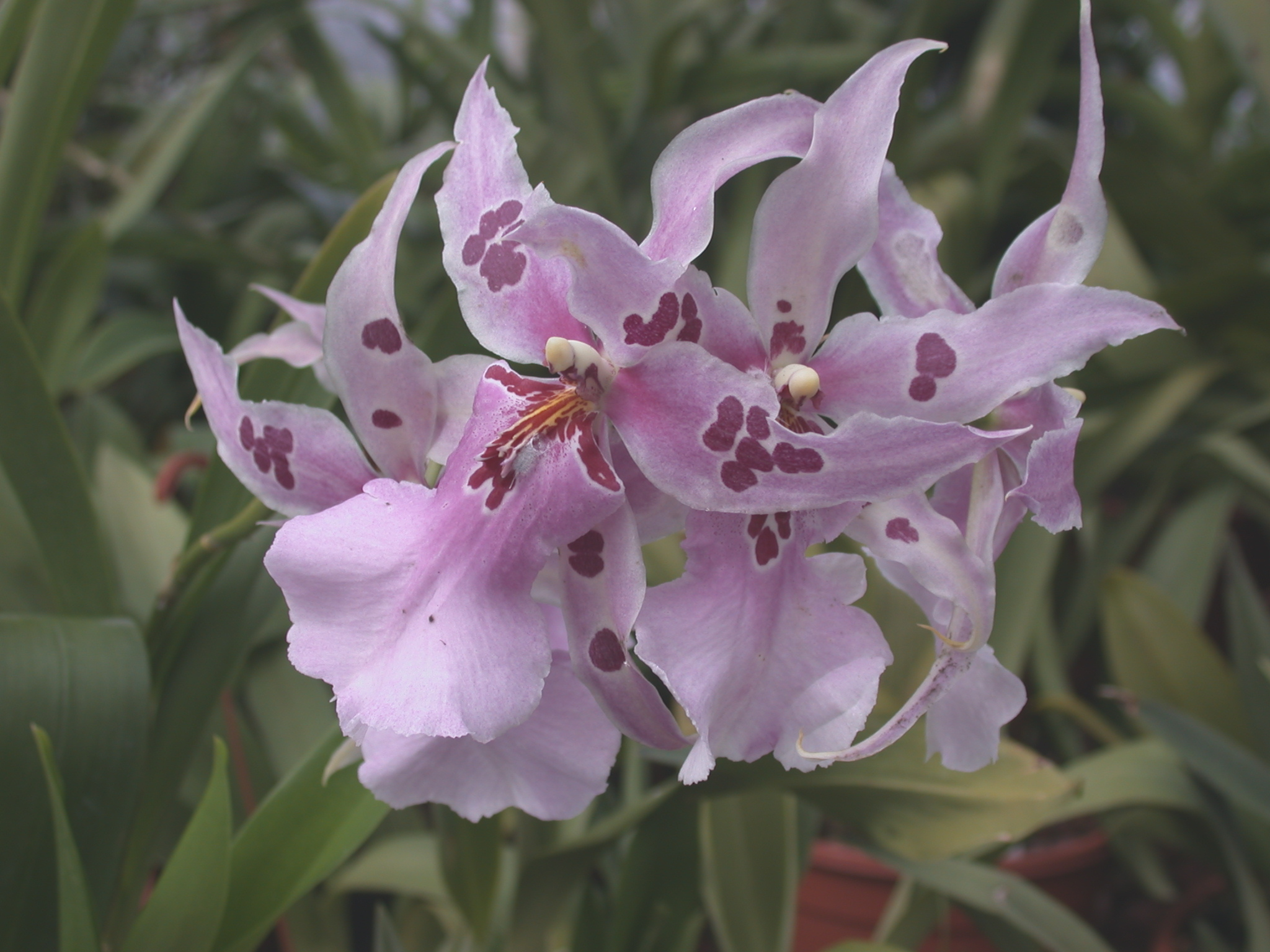
'Peggy Ruth Carpenter'

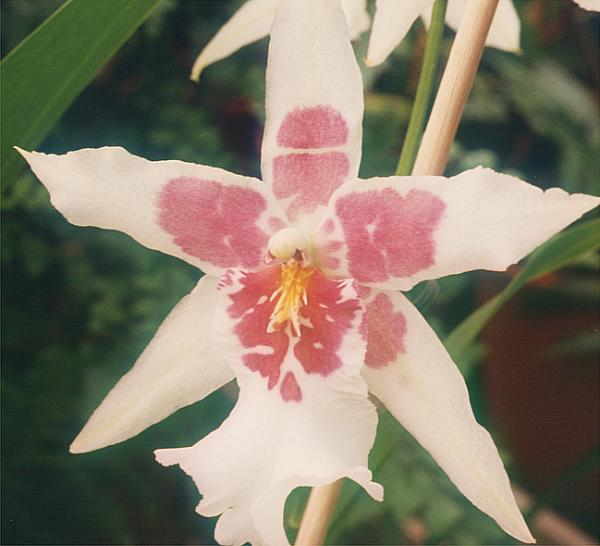
'Tahoma Glacier'

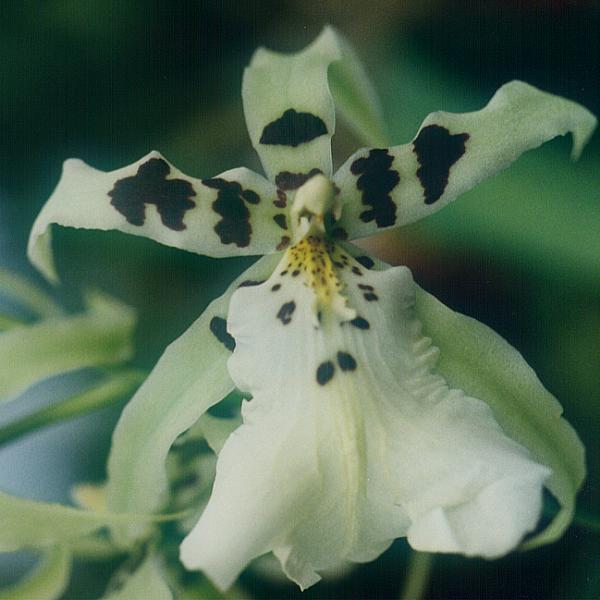
'Tropic Splendor'
