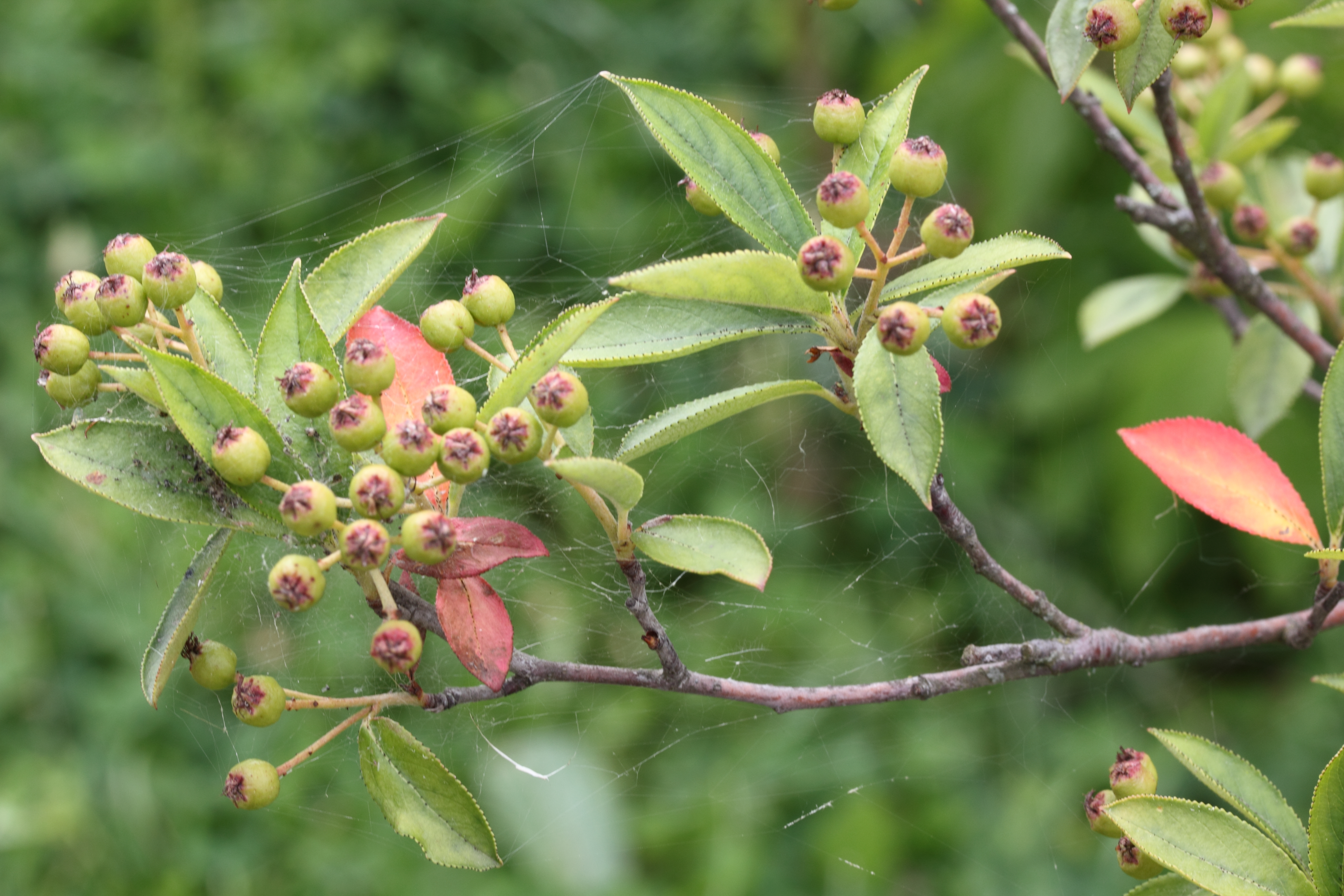
- Young fruit of cultivar "Viking"

Scientific classification
- Kingdom: Plantae
- Clade: Embryophytes
- Clade: Tracheophytes
- Clade: Spermatophytes
- Clade: Angiosperms
- Clade: Eudicots
- Clade: Rosids
- Order: Rosales
- Family: Rosaceae
- Subfamily: Amygdaloideae
- Tribe: Maleae
- Subtribe: Malinae
- Genus: × Sorbaronia; C.K.Schneid.

Species
- See text.

= × Sorbaronia =

Genus of flowering plants

× Sorbaronia is a hybrid genus of flowering plants belonging to the family Rosaceae. The hybrids are between species of Sorbus and Aronia. It is native to Eastern Canada. In addition, × Sorbaronia fallax has been created artificially.

== Species ==
As of February 2024, Plants of the World Online accepted four naturally occurring hybrids and one artificial hybrid:

- × Sorbaronia arsenii (Britton ex L.Arsène) G.N.Jones
- × Sorbaronia fallax (C.K.Schneid.) C.K.Schneid.
- × Sorbaronia jackii Rehder
- × Sorbaronia monstrosa (Zabel) C.K.Schneid.
- × Sorbaronia sorbifolia (Poir.) C.K.Schneid.
