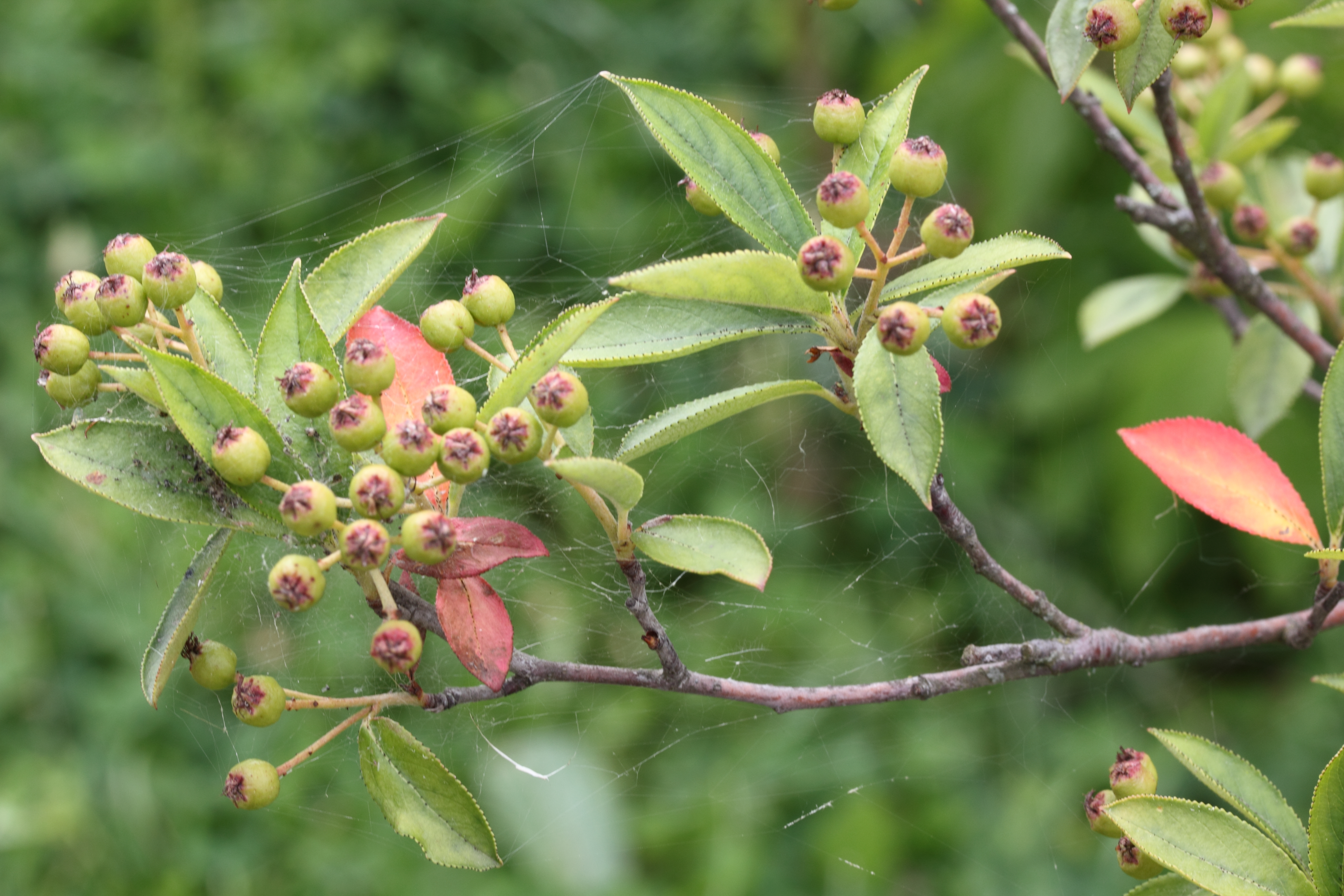
- Young fruit of cultivar 'Viking'

Scientific classification
- Kingdom: Plantae
- Clade: Tracheophytes
- Clade: Angiosperms
- Clade: Eudicots
- Clade: Rosids
- Order: Rosales
- Family: Rosaceae
- Genus: × Sorbaronia
- Species: × S. fallax

Binomial name
- × Sorbaronia fallax (C.K.Schneid.) C.K.Schneid.

Synonyms
- Aronia × mitschurinii A.K.Skvortsov & Maitul.; Pyrus × fallax (C.K.Schneid.) Asch. & Graebn.; Pyrus × mitschurinii (A.K.Skvortsov & Maitul.) M.F.Fay & Christenh.; × Sorbaronia mitschurinii (Skvortsov & Maitul.) Sennikov; Sorbus × fallax C.K.Schneid.

= × Sorbaronia fallax =

Species of flowering plant

× Sorbaronia fallax, synonyms including × Sorbaronia mitschurinii and Aronia × mitschurinii, is an artificial hybrid between Aronia melanocarpa and Sorbus aucuparia. Before genetic testing, it was thought to be a hybrid among cultivars of Aronia melanocarpa, common ones including 'Viking' and 'Nero'. It has been suggested that × Sorbaronia fallax is the product of Russian pomologist Ivan Vladimirovich Michurin's early 20th-century experiments in wide hybridizations.

== Description ==
This species is more robust than wild populations of Aronia melanocarpa; the leaves are broader, and the fruits larger. It is tetraploid and self-fertile.

== Uses ==
× Sorbaronia fallax has historically seen extensive cultivation in the former Soviet Union as its large fruits are suitable for juice, wine, and jam-making, and because they are self-fertile, requiring only one plant to produce fruit.

Like Aronia species, the fruit is used as a flavoring or colorant for beverages or yogurts. Juice from the ripe berries is astringent, sweet (with high sugar content), sour (low pH), and contains vitamin C. In addition to juice, the fruit can be baked into soft breads.
