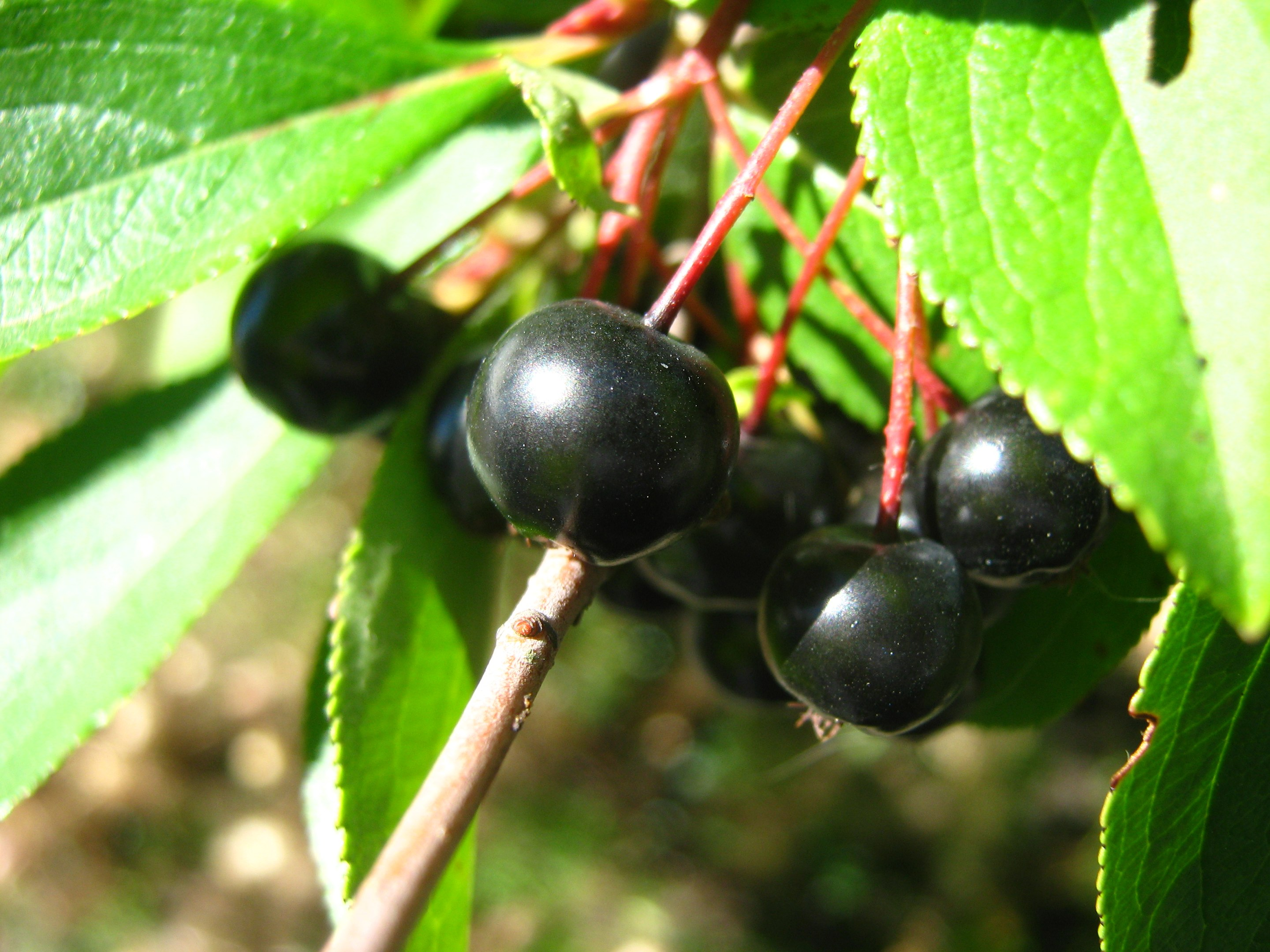
- Aronia berries

Scientific classification
- Kingdom: Plantae
- Clade: Embryophytes
- Clade: Tracheophytes
- Clade: Angiosperms
- Clade: Eudicots
- Clade: Rosids
- Order: Rosales
- Family: Rosaceae
- Subfamily: Amygdaloideae
- Tribe: Maleae
- Subtribe: Malinae
- Genus: Aronia; Medik. 1789, conserved name not J. Mitch. 1769 nor Mitch. 1748

Species
- Aronia arbutifolia (L.) Pers.; Aronia melanocarpa (Michx.) Elliott; Aronia × prunifolia (Marshall) Rehder; See also × Sorbaronia fallax, sometimes called Aronia mitschurinii

Synonyms
- Adenorachis (de Candolle) Nieuwland; Pyrus Linnaeus sect. Adenorachis de Candolle; Sorbus Linnaeus sect. Aronia (Medikus) C. K. Schneider

= Aronia =

Genus of plants (chokeberries)

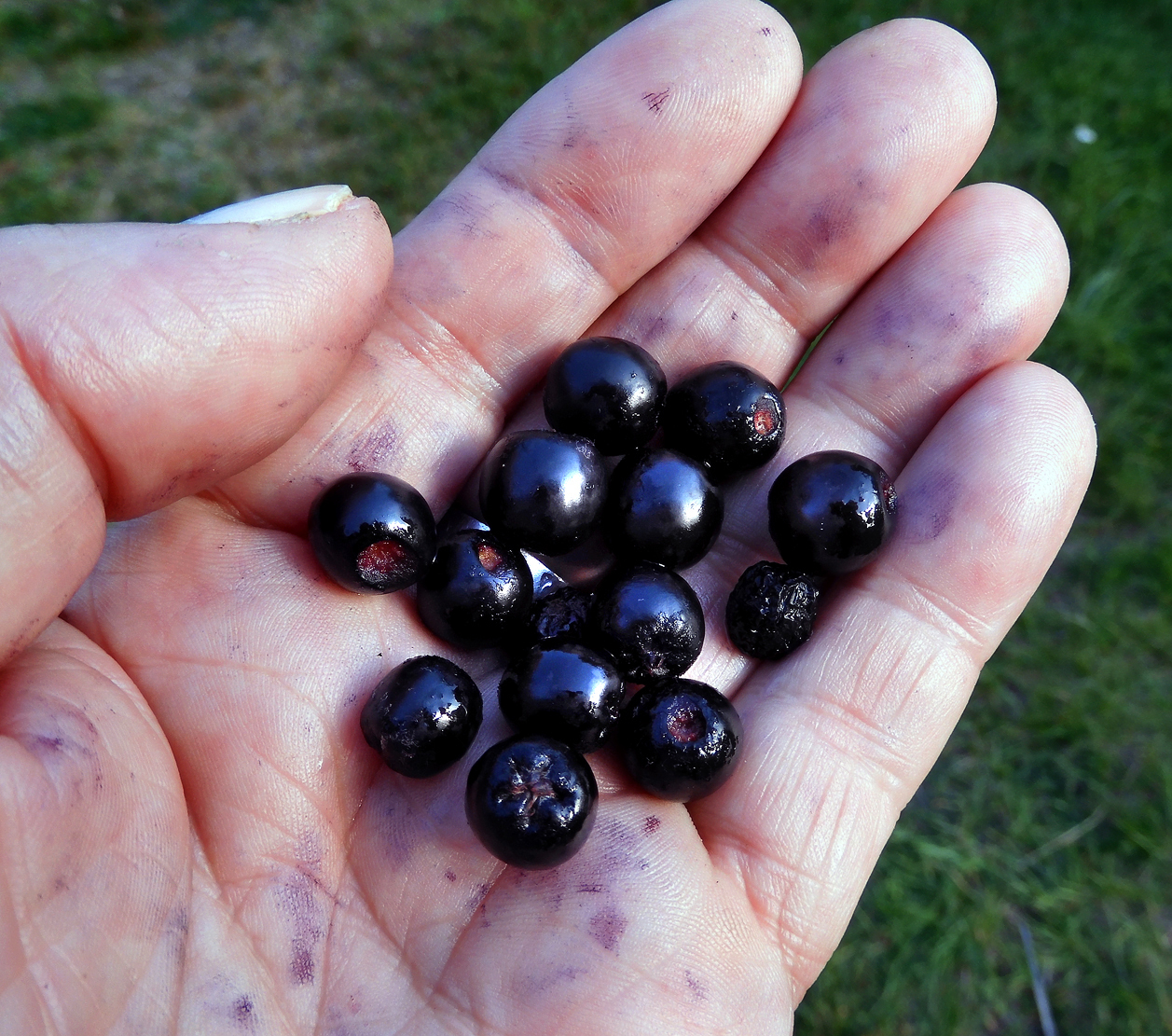
Aronia berries.

Aronia is a genus of deciduous shrubs, the chokeberries, in the family Rosaceae native to eastern North America and most commonly found in wet woods and swamps. The genus Aronia is considered to have 3 species. The most common and widely used is Aronia melanocarpa (black chokeberry) which emerged from Eastern North America. The lesser known Aronia arbutifolia (red chokeberry) and the hybrid form of the above mentioned species called Aronia prunifolia (purple chokeberry) were first cultivated in Central and Eastern North America. In the eighteenth century, the first shrubs of the best-known species Aronia melanocarpa reached Europe where they were first cultivated in Scandinavia and Russia.

Chokeberries are cultivated as an ornamental plant and as a food plant. The bitter berries, or aronia berries, can be eaten fresh off the bush, but are more frequently processed. They can be used to make wine, jam, syrup, juice, soft spreads, tea, salsa, extracts, beer, ice cream, gummies, and tinctures. The name "chokeberry" comes from the astringency of the fruits, which create the sensation of making one's mouth pucker.

Chokeberries are often mistakenly called chokecherries, the common name for Prunus virginiana. Further adding to the ambiguity, a variety of Prunus virginiana is melanocarpa, and readily confused with black chokeberry because it is commonly referred to as "black chokeberry" or "aronia". Aronia berries and chokecherries both contain polyphenolic compounds, such as anthocyanins, yet the two plants are somewhat distantly related within the Amygdaloideae subfamily. Black chokeberry is grown as a common shrub in Central Europe where it is mainly used for food production.

== Identification and taxonomy ==
The leaves are alternate, simple, and oblanceolate with crenate margins and pinnate venation; in autumn, the leaves turn a bold red color. Dark trichomes are present on the upper midrib surface. The flowers are small, with five petals and five sepals, and produced in corymbs of 10–25 together. The hypanthium is urn-shaped. The fruit is a small pome, with an astringent flavor.

Aronia has been thought to be closely related to Photinia, and has been included in that genus in some classifications, but botanist Cornelis Kalkman observed that a combined genus should be under the older name Aronia. The combined genus contains about 65 species. In 2004, Kalkman expressed doubt about the monophyly of the combined group, and new molecular studies confirm this. They do not place these two genera together or even near one another.

In eastern North America, two well-known species are named after their fruit color, red chokeberry and black chokeberry, plus a purple chokeberry whose origin is a natural hybrid of the two. What has been regarded as a fourth species, Aronia mitschurinii, that apparently originated in cultivation, is now treated as × Sorbaronia fallax.

Flowers Fruit	Scientific name Common name	Description	Distribution
	Aronia arbutifolia (Photinia pyrifolia) Red chokeberry	grows to 2–4m (6.5–13 ft) tall, rarely up to 6 m (19.6 ft) and 1–2 m (3-6.5 ft) wide. Leaves are 5–8 cm wide and densely pubescent on the underside. The flowers are white or pale pink, 1 cm wide, with glandular sepals. The fruit is red, 4–10 mm wide, persisting into winter.	Eastern Canada and to the eastern and central United States, from eastern Texas to Nova Scotia inland to Ontario, Ohio, Kentucky, and Oklahoma
	Aronia melanocarpa (Photinia melanocarpa), Black chokeberry	tends to be smaller, rarely exceeding 1–2 m (3–6 ft) tall and wide, and spreads readily by root sprouts. The leaves are smaller, not more than 6-cm wide, with terminal glands on leaf teeth and a glabrous underside. The flowers are white, 1.5 cm wide, with glabrous sepals. The fruit is black, 6–9 mm wide, not persisting into winter.	Eastern North America, ranging from Canada to the central United States, from Newfoundland west to Ontario and Minnesota, south as far as Arkansas, Alabama, and Georgia
	Aronia × prunifolia (Photinia floribunda) Purple chokeberry	apparently originated as a hybrid of the black and red chokeberries but might be more accurately considered a distinct species than a hybrid (see also nothospecies). Leaves are moderately pubescent on the underside. Few to no glands are present on the sepal surface. The fruit is dark purple to black, 7–10 mm in width, not persisting into winter. There are purple chokeberry populations which seem to be self-sustaining independent of the two parent species – including an introduced one in northern Germany where neither parent species occurs – leading botanist Alan Weakley to consider it a full species rather than a hybrid. The range of the purple chokeberry is roughly that of the black chokeberry; it is found in areas (such as Michigan and Missouri), where the red chokeberry is not.	Eastern Canada and to the eastern and central United States, from Nova Scotia west to Ontario and Wisconsin, south as far as western South Carolina, with an isolated population reported in southern Alabama

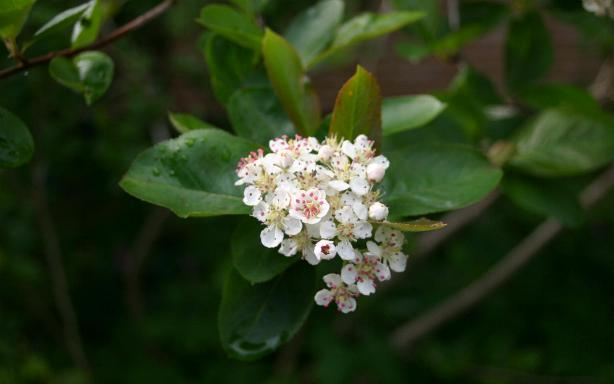
Aronia flowers and leaves (Aronia melanocarpa)

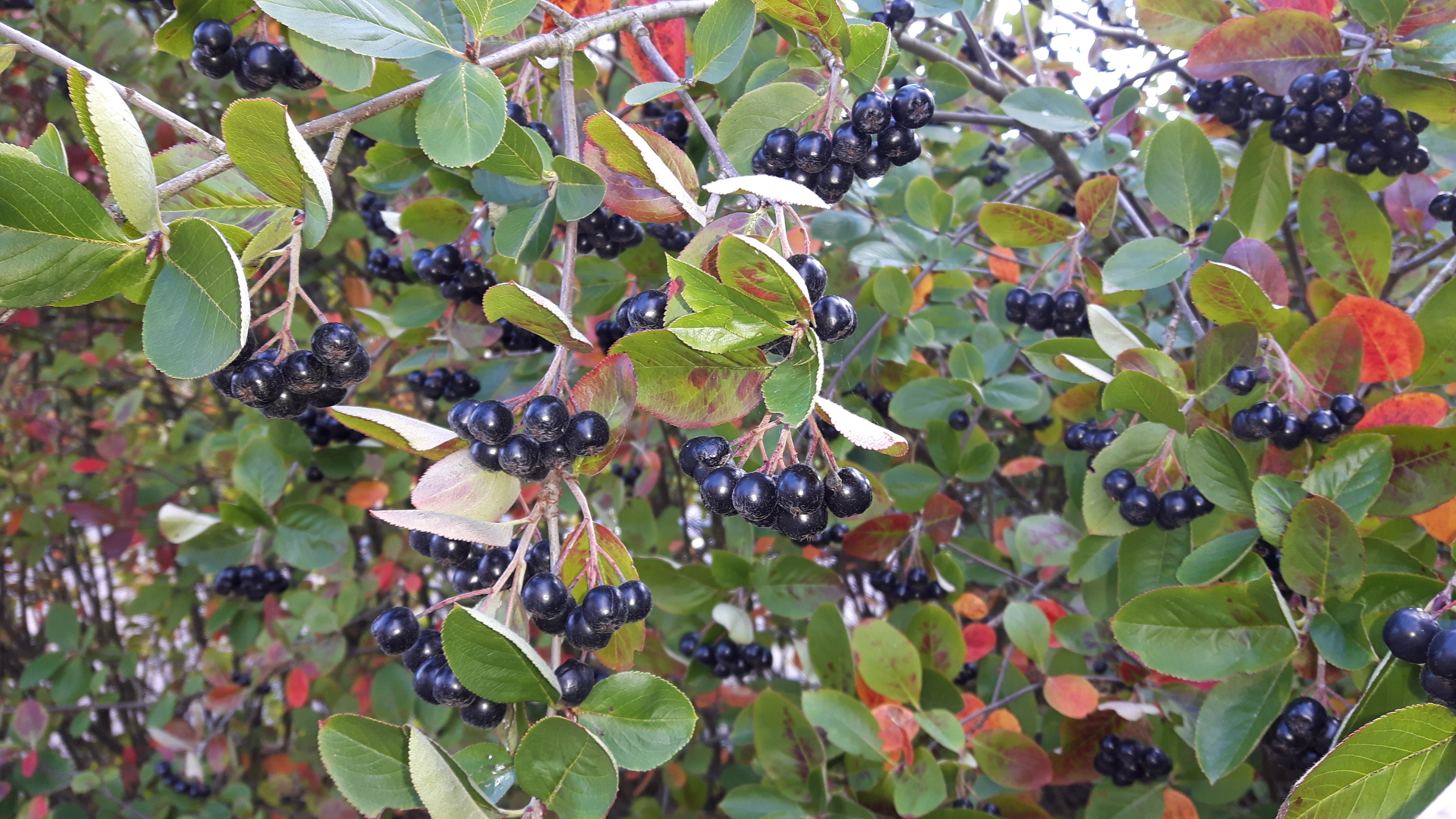
Purple chokeberry (Aronia prunifolia)

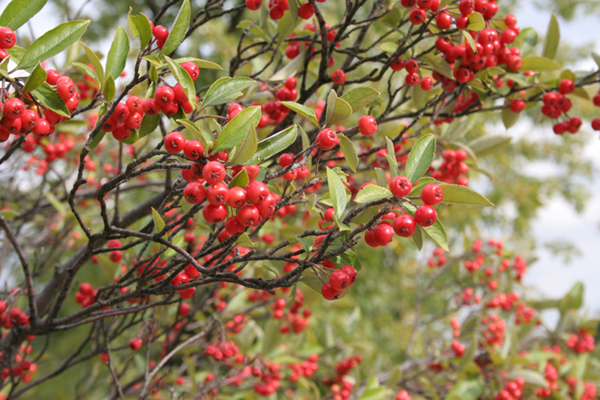
Red chokeberry (Aronia arbutifolia)

== Nutrition ==
Nutrient	Mass in fruit [g/100g]	Mass in pomace [g/100g]
Total sugars	6.21–42.1	—
Fructose	2.2–15.8	—
Total fiber	—	57.8–71.6
Dietary fiber	—	43.8–61.7
Lignin	—	22.68
Cellulose	—	34.56
Pectin	—	7.52
Protein	0.7	—
Fat	0.14%	—
Vitamins	[mg/100g]	[mg/100g]
Vitamin C	7.25–98.75	—
Vitamin A	0.77	—
Vitamin B_{5}	2.845	—
Vitamin B_{6}	1.132	—
Minerals	[mg/100g]	[mg/100g]
Na	0.427–1.18	—
K	135–679	—
Ca	11.9–116.7	—
Mg	8.3–66.9	—
P	23.9–95.6	—
Organic compounds	[mg/100g]	[mg/100g]
Anthocyanins	284–631	—
Proanthocyanidin	522–1,000	6,200–9,720
Flavonols	3.9–61.7	22.7–43.7

== Cultivation ==
=== Soil and climate requirements ===
The chokeberry is a characteristic shrub of the northern hemisphere. Its climatic requirements are temperate and cool temperatures. The shrubs are extremely winter hardy and can survive temperatures down to −30 °C without damage if they are in winter dormancy. After flowers form in late April/early May, the plants become sensitive to frost. Chokeberries are usually planted in early spring after thaw but autumn is also possible if the plantation is mulched or snow covered during frost.

The chokeberry has a shallow and compact root system and thrives in humus and nutrient rich soils that are frost free, unflooded and with a rather low groundwater level. While the plant is moisture-loving, it also tolerates dry periods. Depending on the timing and intensity, these dry periods are yield limiting. While the crop needs more than 500 mm of precipitation, good yields can be obtained at 700–800 mm. Furthermore, chokeberries are sun loving and usually thrive better under direct sunlight rather than in shade.

=== Seedbed requirements and sowing ===
Chokeberries grows on medium-heavy soils, which can be neutral to slightly acidic. Before planting, it is advisable to promote soil structure and humus formation, which can be enhanced by green manuring using organic fertilizers and deep tillage of the soil. Planting chokeberries in an existing grass plot is not recommended, due to the strong competition of weeds in the understock area. Commonly, two-to-three-year-old bare-root plants are set between October and November. Machine planting places about 3000 seedlings per hectare, each 20–25 cm deep into the soil. Plant distance is 60 cm and row distance is given by the harvest machine.

=== Crop sequence requirements ===
If chokeberries are planted directly after a previous cultivation of other Rosaceae, an intercrop such as cereals is recommended, as well as staggered row planting, since chokeberries might suffer from a replant disease (also: soil fatigue).

=== Cultivation management ===
For the first two years, much attention should be given to keeping the understock area clear during maintenance. The understock maintenance can be done by machine hacking or by using a string trimmer with protection. Covering the plant strip with mulch also helps to minimize weeds. When maintaining the alley, it is important to cut it every 3–4 weeks. The young plants are sensitive to drought stress, so proper watering should be guaranteed. At the beginning the plant needs to put its energy into vegetative growth, therefore it helps to remove flower buds. In order to achieve a balanced fruit quality in the long term, the plant, which grows as a shrub, should be trimmed regularly. Furthermore, uniform plant stands are easier to manage and harvest by machine. As a rule, chokeberry branches achieve the highest yields in the 5-6 year period, so cutting is not done again until the 7th year.

The aim of both the mechanical and the manual cutting system, is to let the shrubs grow into a closed hedge. While in the mechanical cutting the whole plant is cut back to a few centimeters above the ground every 6th year during the winter dormancy. The manual cutting removes the oldest shoots, the weak annual shoots and those shoots that are inside the cane slightly above the base of the cane in the winter dormancy. In the case of manual cutting, the ages of 1-6 year old shoots should be present in equal proportions after cutting, thus the chokeberry forms robust shoots and allows uniform harvests from year to year.

=== Fertilization requirements ===
For optimal fertilization, collecting soil samples before the planting of the seedlings is required. The soil analysis enables planning of effective fertilizer applications. In the first two years, after planting the seedlings, there must be enough nutrients in the soil so that the seedlings can grow optimally, including phosphate (P), potassium (K) and magnesium (Mg) and, therefore, they should be present at the beginning of vegetation period. When potassium levels in the soil are low, the nutrients can be supplied via cattle manure and cattle slurry. If the potassium content in the soil is high, it is better to use compost, since a too high potassium concentration inhibits the uptake of magnesium, calcium and ammonium. However, there is no need to be too sensitive about potassium levels in the first few years, since a high amount is basically needed. It is clear that nitrogen fertilization is necessary. Often, one half is applied at the beginning of vegetation period and the other half at flowering. Since the plant already has a greater growth potential in the second year, the amounts of fertilizer can be increased a little. From the third year on, the chokeberry has the full nutrient requirement. Depending on the vigor, wood maturity and yield, the fertilizer quantities can be slightly adjusted upwards or downwards. Through the targeted strip fertilization, the amount of fertilizer can be reduced by 1/3, which may be of economic interest to the cultivator.

=== Breeding ===
One part of the breeding efforts focuses on improving red chokeberries for their use as ornamental plants. Breeding goals include the reduction of the plants stature, reduction of its tendency towards legginess, increasing the fruit size and improving leaf retention for a longer lasting fall foliage. Breeding of the red chokeberry is difficult, because the available accessions are tetraploid plants and thus, are likely to produce apomictic seeds. Furthermore, the breeding of polyploids makes mutation breeding more challenging because the additional sets of chromosome can mask incomplete mutations. If breeders had access to a wild diploid A. arbutifolia breeding would arguably become more successful.

The breeding success of the black chokeberry for food production in Europe and Russia has been restricted because the genetic pool of the domesticated Russian plants is homogeneous. Breeding efforts aim to increase the content of polyphenol compounds while maintaining or increasing the fruit size. Further breeding targets are improvement of flavor.

=== Harvest and post-harvest treatment ===
The continuous monitoring of fruit development helps to determine the specific time of harvest. To monitor the fruit development about 200 berries per hectare are removed, mixed and pressed into juice. From this juice the sugar content can be measured, which should be between 15 and 20° Brix, because only then the sugar content is high enough to overtone the tannins in taste.

The harvest of the chokeberry takes place between the end of August and the beginning of September. In this time span, there are fruits of different ripeness on the shrub. While the upper part is often already ripe, the lower part is not yet edible. A recommended harvest time is when the upper berries begin to shrivel slightly, but do not yet show any weight loss. In this way, a large part can be harvested in an optimal ripening state while the other part can still post-ripen.

Harvesting is done by hand, especially for fresh sales and the production of dried berries, where the appearance of the berries is important. The majority of other harvesting is done by machine. In manual harvesting, cleanly harvested fruits are stored in bunches. Thus, about 7 kg can be picked by hand per working hour. It is important that the berries are processed the same day to keep the quality high. For mechanical harvesting, the bushes are pulled in sideways by the harvesting machine and the berries are knocked off with sticks. Machine harvesting requires three people and the machine can harvest one hectare in one day. In the case of mechanical harvesting, many berries are injured after harvesting and in any case should be processed the same day.

=== Yield ===
After growing chokeberries from seeds it takes between 3 and 5 years until the plants begin to yield fruits. However, from a parent plant up to 20 rooted plants can be derived which already start yielding after 2 to 3 years. After the plants are fully matured a well growing plantation can yield between 3 and 12 tonnes of chokeberry fruits per hectare.

== Pests and diseases ==
Chokeberries have a low susceptibility to plant diseases and only little problems with pests. Their resistance makes chokeberries a well suited crop for organic agriculture. The high content of flavonoids in the fruits and their acidic taste are likely to protect the chokeberry against pathogens and pests.

Here is a list of some possible pests and diseases of chokeberries:

Pests

- Aphids e.g., apple aphid (Aphis pomi), woolly aphid (Eriosoma lanigerum)
- Mites e.g., leaf blister mite (Eriophyes piri)
- Drosophila suzukii – some studies found that Drosophila suzukii mainly infests damaged or destemmed fruits, while intact fruits are more resistant
- Tooth-nose snout weevils (Rhynchitidae)
- Wasps
- Cockchafer grub
- Codling moth

Also, birds, mice and deer might feed on different parts of the chokeberry and thereby damage the plant.

Fungal diseases

- Dead arm disease (Phomopsis viticola)
- Rusts (Pucciniales)
- Powdry mildew (Erysiphales)

Bacterial diseases

- Pseudomonas syringae
- An infection with fire blight is theoretically possible, as chokeberries belong to the family of Rosaceae, but has so far not been observed.

The treatment methods for the different pests and diseases differ depending on the chosen agricultural practice (e.g. organic vs. conventional agriculture). Often mechanical measures can be taken such as ensuring sufficient sunlight and aeration between the plants or spanning nets as a protection against picking birds.

== Products and uses ==
The chokeberries are attractive ornamental plants for gardens. They are naturally understory and woodland edge plants, and grow well when planted under trees. Chokeberries are resistant to drought, insects, pollution, and disease. A number of cultivars, including A. arbutifolia 'Brilliant' and A. melanocarpa 'Autumn magic', have been selected for their striking autumn leaf color.

An aronia wine is made in Lithuania and Minnesota. They were traditionally used in pemmican. In Poland, aronia berries are added to jams and juices or dried to make an herbal tea sometimes blended with other ingredients, such as blackcurrant. In Bosnia and Herzegovina, the berries are sold fresh and frozen or made into juices, jams and teas. Aronia is also used as a flavoring or colorant for beverages or yogurts. Juice from the ripe berries is astringent, semi-sweet (moderate sugar content), sour (low pH), and contains a low level of vitamin C. The berries have a tart flavor and, in addition to juice, can be baked into breads. In the United States, Canada and the United Kingdom, aronia juice concentrate is used in manufactured juice blends.

== Polyphenols ==
A. melanocarpa (black chokeberry) has attracted scientific interest due to its deep purple, almost black pigmentation that arises from dense contents of polyphenols, especially anthocyanins. Total polyphenol content is 1752 mg per 100 g dry weight, anthocyanin content is 1480 mg per 100 g dry weight, and proanthocyanidin concentration is 664 mg per 100 g fresh weight. These values are among the highest measured in plants to date. The black aronia species contains higher levels of anthocyanins than purple (Aronia prunifolia) or red aronia (Aronia arbutifolia), whereas red and purple aronia are richer in phenolic acid and proanthocyanins.

The plant produces these pigments mainly in the leaves and skin of the berries to protect the pulp and seeds from constant exposure to ultraviolet (UV) radiation and production of free radicals. Many of these pigments are able to absorb UV light—beyond the visible spectrum—reducing damage to plant tissues. In the visible light range, the pigments appear blue, purple, or red because they reflect those colors while absorbing other wavelengths. These same bright colors also attract birds and other animals to eat the fruit, which helps disperse the seeds.

Analysis of polyphenols in chokeberries has identified the following individual chemicals (among hundreds known to exist in the plant kingdom): cyanidin-3-galactoside, cyanidin-3-arabinoside, quercetin-3-glycoside, epicatechin, caffeic acid, delphinidin, petunidin, pelargonidin, peonidin, and malvidin. All these except caffeic acid are members of the flavonoid category of phenolics.

For reference to phenolics, flavonoids, anthocyanins, and similar plant-derived phytochemicals, Wikipedia has a list of phytochemicals and foods in which they are prominent.
