= Hybrid name =

Nomenclature of hybrid species

In botanical nomenclature, a hybrid may be given a hybrid name, which is a special kind of botanical name, but there is no requirement that a hybrid name should be created for plants that are believed to be of hybrid origin. The International Code of Nomenclature for algae, fungi, and plants (ICNafp) provides the following options in dealing with a hybrid:

- A hybrid may get a name if the author considers it necessary (in practice, authors tend to use this option for naturally occurring hybrids), but it is recommended to use parents' names as they are more informative (art. H.10B.1).
- A hybrid may also be indicated by a formula listing the parents. Such a formula uses the multiplication sign "×" to link the parents.
  - "It is usually preferable to place the names or epithets in a formula in alphabetical order. The direction of a cross may be indicated by including the sexual symbols (♀: female; ♂: male) in the formula, or by placing the female parent first. If a non-alphabetical sequence is used, its basis should be clearly indicated." (H.2A.1)
- Grex names can be given to orchid hybrids.

A hybrid name is treated like other botanical names, for most purposes, but differs in that:

- A hybrid name does not necessarily refer to a morphologically distinctive group, but applies to all progeny of the parents, no matter how much they vary.
  - E.g., Magnolia × soulangeana applies to all progeny from the cross Magnolia denudata × Magnolia liliiflora, and from the crosses of all their progeny, as well as from crosses of any of the progeny back to the parents (backcrossing). This covers quite a range in flower colour.
  - Grex names (for orchids only) differ in that they do not cover crosses from plants within the grex (F2 hybrids) or back-crosses (crosses between a grex member and its parent).

Hybrids can be named with ranks, like other organisms covered by the ICNafp. They are nothotaxa, from notho- (hybrid) + taxon. If the parents (or postulated parents) differ in rank, then the rank of the nothotaxon is the lowest. The names of nothospecies differ depending on whether they are derived from species within the same genus; if more than one parental genus is involved, then the nothospecies name includes a nothogenus name.

- Pyrus × bretschneideri is a hybrid between two species in the genus Pyrus.
- × Pyraria irregularis, in the nothogenus Pyraria, is a hybrid between Aria edulis and Pyrus communis.

The formerly used term nothomorph denoted a rank of taxa that was subordinate within a nothospecies. Names published previously as nothomorphs are now treated as names of varieties.

== Publication of names ==
Names of hybrids between genera (called nothogenera) can be published by specifying the names of the parent genera, but without a scientific description, and do not have a type. Nothotaxon names with the rank of a subdivision of a genus (notho-subgenus, notho-section, notho-series, etc.) are also published by listing the parent taxa and without descriptions or types.

== Forms of hybrid names ==
A hybrid name can be indicated by:

- a multiplication sign "×" placed before the name of an intergeneric hybrid or before the epithet of a species hybrid. An intervening space is optional. e.g.:
  - × Sorbaronia or ×Sorbaronia is the name of hybrids between the genera Sorbus and Aronia,
  - Iris × germanica or Iris ×germanica is a species derived by hybrid speciation
- or by the prefix notho- attached to the rank (from Ancient Greek νόθος, nóthos, "bastard")
  - Crataegus nothosect. Crataeguineae
  - Iris germanica nothovar. florentina.

The multiplication sign and the prefix notho- are not part of the actual name and are disregarded for nomenclatural purposes such as synonymy, homonymy, etc. This means that a taxonomist could decide to use either form of this name: Drosera ×anglica to emphasize that it is a hybrid, or Drosera anglica to emphasize that it is a species.

The names of intergeneric hybrids generally have a special form called a condensed formula, e.g., × Agropogon for hybrids between Agrostis and Polypogon. Hybrids involving four or more genera are formed from the name of a person, with suffix -ara, e.g., × Belleara. Names for hybrids between three genera can be either a condensed formula or formed from a person's name with suffix -ara.

== Notation ==
The symbol used to indicate a hybrid is U+00D7 × MULTIPLICATION SIGN. (Linnaeus originally used U+263F ☿ MERCURY, but abandoned it in favour of the multiplication sign.)

== See also ==
- Botanical nomenclature
  - International Code of Nomenclature for algae, fungi, and plants
- Graft-chimaera names look similar, but use U+002B + PLUS SIGN.
- Glossary of scientific naming
