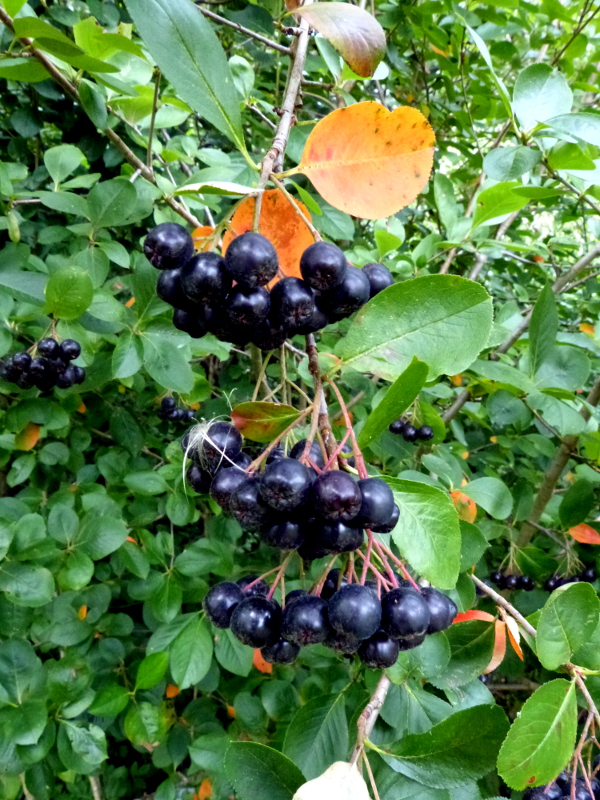

Scientific classification
- Kingdom: Plantae
- Clade: Tracheophytes
- Clade: Angiosperms
- Clade: Eudicots
- Clade: Rosids
- Order: Rosales
- Family: Rosaceae
- Genus: Aronia
- Species: A. melanocarpa

Binomial name
- Aronia melanocarpa (Michx.) Elliott 1821

Synonyms
- Synonymy: Mespilus arbutifolia var. melanocarpa Michx. 1803; Adenorachis melanocarpa (Michx.) Nieuwl.; Aronia nigra (Willd.) Britton; Photinia melanocarpa (Michx.) K.R.Robertson & J.B.Phipps; Pyrus melanocarpa (Michx.) Willd.; Sorbus melanocarpa (Michx.) Heynh.

= Aronia melanocarpa =

Species of flowering plant

Aronia melanocarpa, called the black chokeberry, is a species of shrubs in the rose family native to eastern North America, ranging from Canada to the central United States, from Newfoundland west to Ontario and Minnesota, south as far as Arkansas, Alabama, and Georgia. This plant has been introduced and is cultivated in Europe.

It is a branching shrub with glossy dark green leaves that take on a red color in the autumn; it grows well in the sun and part-shade, often to heights of six feet (1.8 m) or more, forming clumps by means of stems rising from the roots. Its flowers are white or pink, appearing at the end of spring and producing black fruits in September. The plants are relatively easy to clone and root, with summer being the optimal time to take cuttings. Some birds eat the berries.

When raw, the fruits are astringent, but the flavor improves when used in recipes with added sugar.

== Phytochemistry ==
Aronia melanocarpa is notable for its rich phytochemical composition, particularly its high content of polyphenolic compounds. The fruit contains significant concentrations of anthocyanins, proanthocyanidins, and phenolic acids. Total phenolic content varies depending on cultivation, processing, and ripeness, placing the fruit among the plant sources with the highest recorded concentration of these chemical constituents.

== Gallery ==
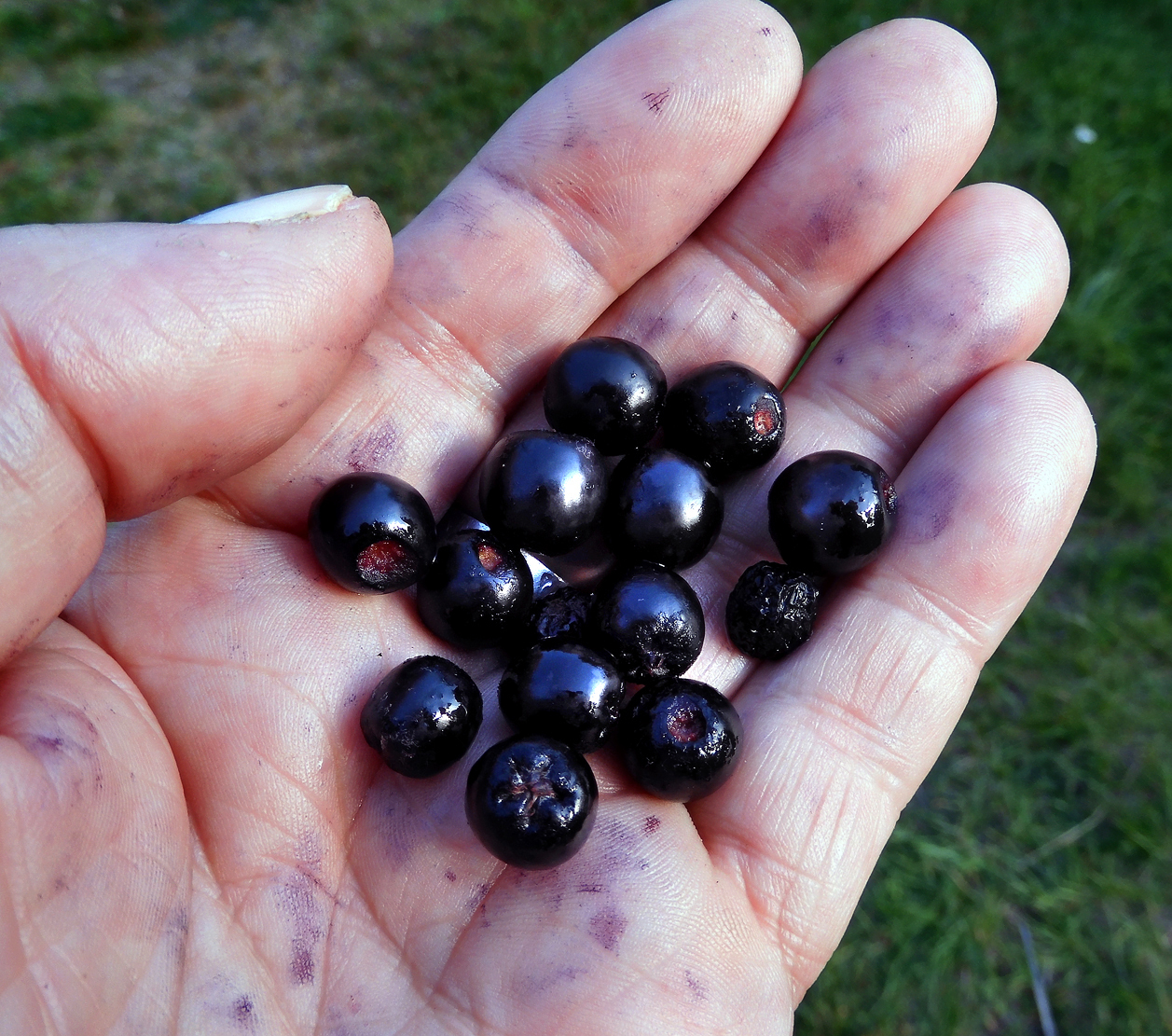
Fresh berries

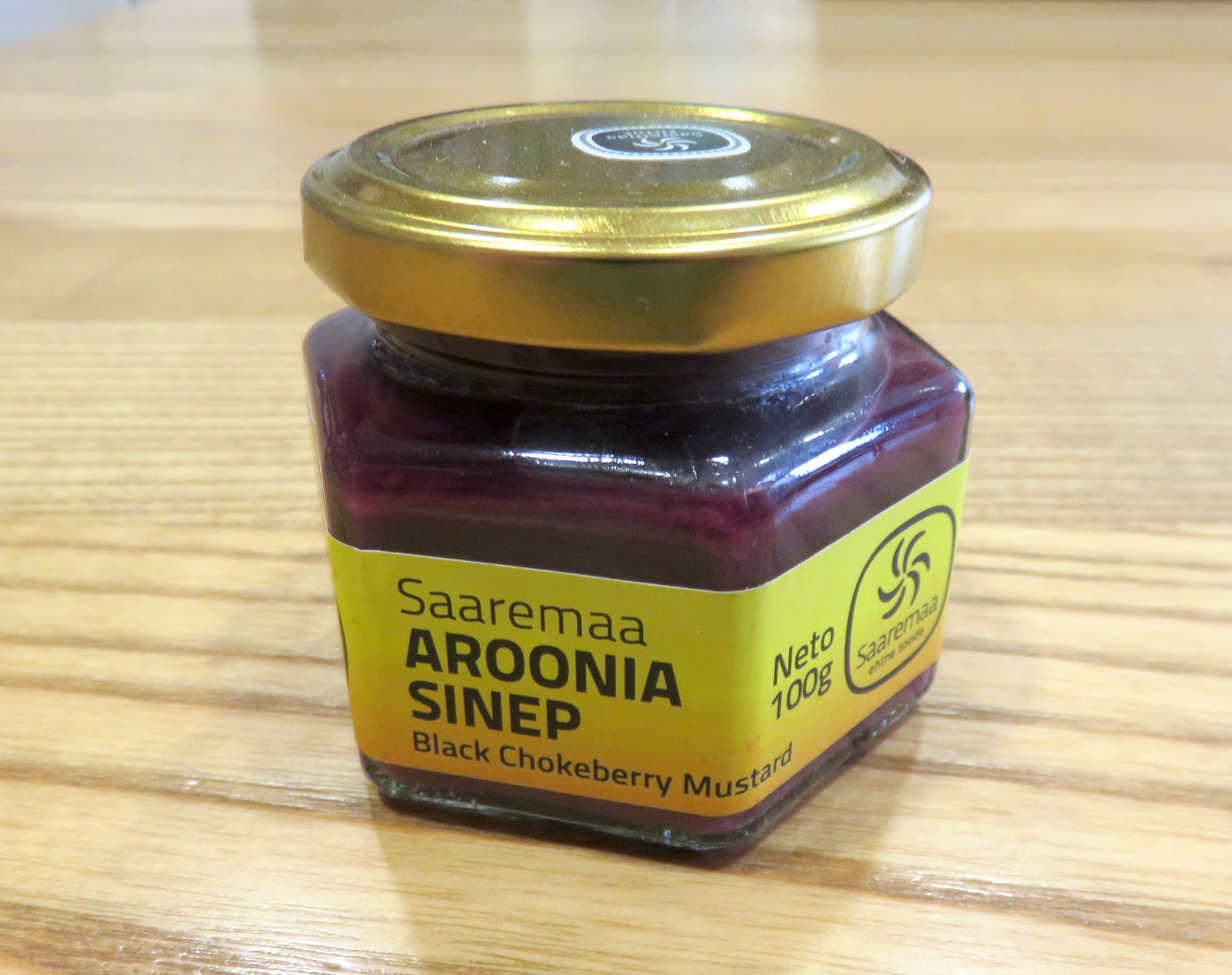
Black chokeberry mustard

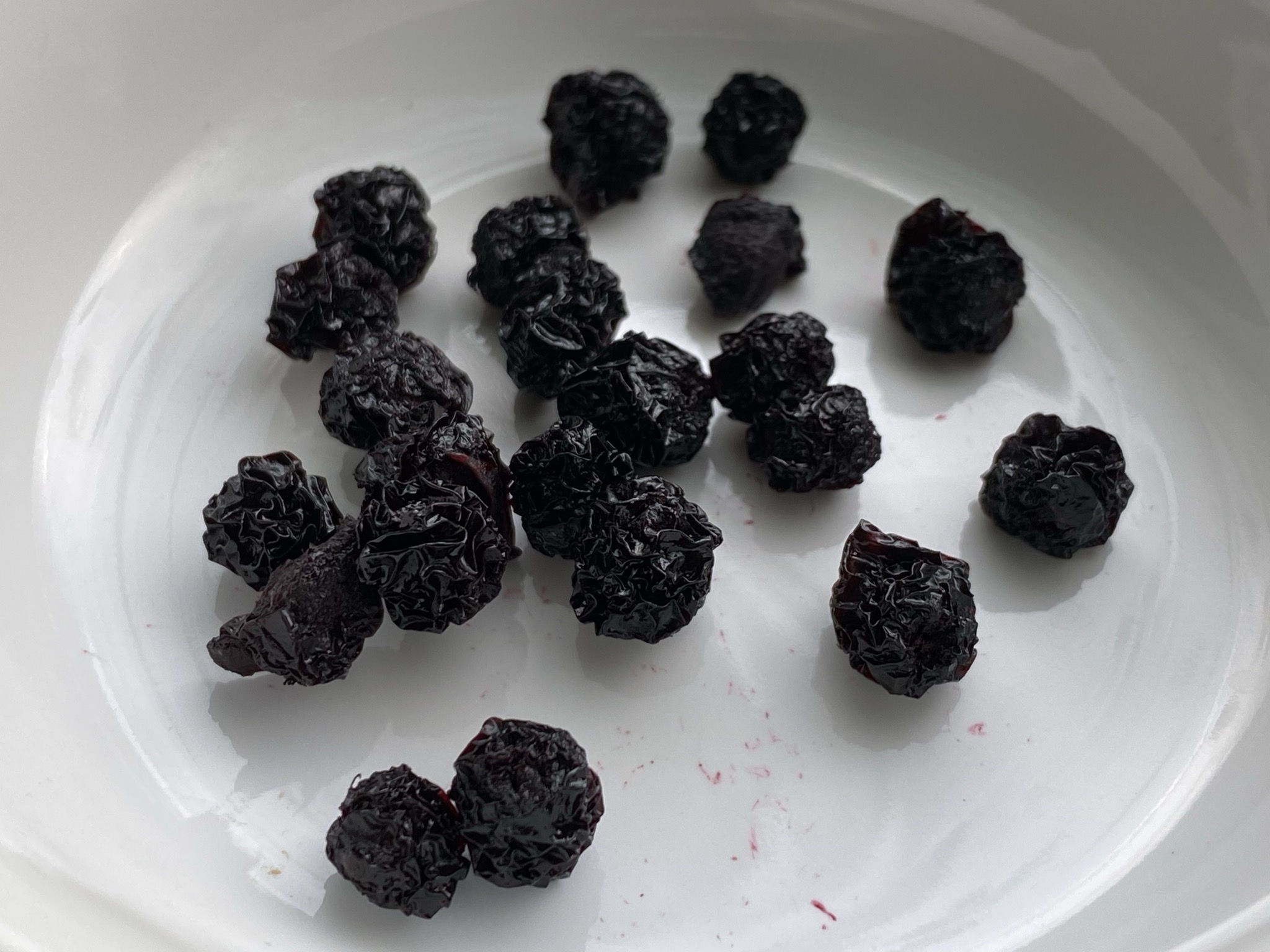
Aronia berries sweetened and dried
