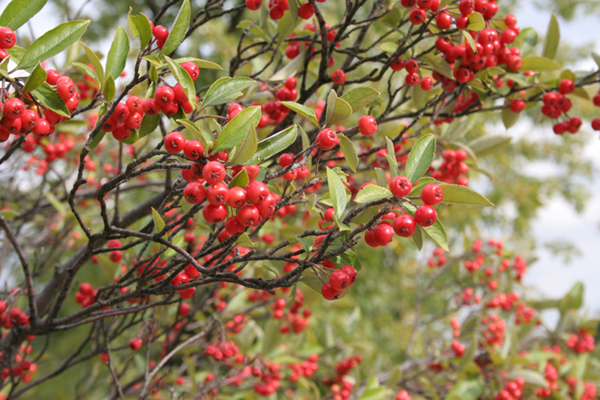

Scientific classification
- Kingdom: Plantae
- Clade: Embryophytes
- Clade: Tracheophytes
- Clade: Spermatophytes
- Clade: Angiosperms
- Clade: Eudicots
- Clade: Rosids
- Order: Rosales
- Family: Rosaceae
- Genus: Aronia
- Species: A. arbutifolia

Binomial name
- Aronia arbutifolia (L.) Pers.

Synonyms
- Synonymy: Mespilus arbutifolia L. 1753; Adenorachis arbutifolia (L.) Nieuwl.; Aronia densa Carrière; Aronia × densiflora Spach; Aronia glabrescens Spach; Aronia nigra Dippel; Aronia pubens Spach; Aronia pumila (Neumann) M.Roem.; Aronia pyrifolia (Lam.) Pers.; Crataegus pyrifolia Lam.; Hahnia arbutifolia (L.) Medik.; Photinia pyrifolia (Lam.) K.R.Robertson & J.B.Phipps; Pyrus arbutifolia (L.) L.f.; Pyrus densiflora (Spach) Steud.; Pyrus pumila Neumann ex Tausch.; Sorbus arbutifolia (L.) Heynh.; Sorbus densiflora (Spach) Heynh.

= Aronia arbutifolia =

Species of flowering plant

Aronia arbutifolia, called the red chokeberry, is a North American species of shrubs in the rose family. It is native to eastern Canada and to the eastern and central United States, from eastern Texas to Nova Scotia inland to Ontario, Ohio, Kentucky, and Oklahoma.

== Description ==
Aronia arbutifolia is a branching shrub forming clumps by means of stems forming from the roots. It may reach a height between 1.8 and 3.6 meters (6 and 12 feet). Flowers are white or pink, producing black or bright red fruits.

== Ecology ==
=== Habitat ===
A. arbutifolia may be found in habitats such as titi bogs, boggy pine flatwoods, various hammocks, and other wet environments. It generally has no response to soil disturbance via clearcutting and chopping.

=== Herbivory ===
A. arbutifolia has been often observed to host insect species such as sweat bees, as well as bees from the Andrenidae family. It has been reported to be consumed by marsh rabbits, and accounts for 5-10% of the diet of a variety of game bird and songbird species.

== Uses ==
It is a popular landscaping plant. The fruits, whose ill taste inspired the common name, are bitterly acidic (though edible) when eaten raw. They are high in pectin and can be used to make delicious thick jams and jellies.
