= C18H22O4 =

The molecular formula C_{18}H_{22}O_{4} (molar mass : 302.36 g/mol) may refer to:

- Enterodiol, a lignan
- Masoprocol, an antineoplastic drug
- Nordihydroguaiaretic acid
