= C20H22O7 =

The molecular formula C_{20}H_{22}O_{7} (molar mass: 374.384 g/mol, exact mass: 374.1366 u) may refer to:

- Diffractaic acid
- Hydroxymatairesinol (HMR)
- Saudin
- Tinosporide
