= Secoisolariciresinol dehydrogenase =

Identifiers
- EC no.: 1.1.1.331

Databases
- IntEnz: IntEnz view
- BRENDA: BRENDA entry
- ExPASy: NiceZyme view
- KEGG: KEGG entry
- MetaCyc: metabolic pathway
- PRIAM: profile
- PDB structures: RCSB PDB PDBe PDBsum
Search
- PMC: articles
- PubMed: articles
- NCBI: proteins

Secoisolariciresinol dehydrogenase (EC 1.1.1.331) is an enzyme with the systematic name (-)-secoisolariciresinol:NAD^{+} oxidoreductase. This enzyme catalyses the following chemical reaction:

secoisolariciresinol
+ 2 NAD^{+}
2 H^{+}
2 H^{+}
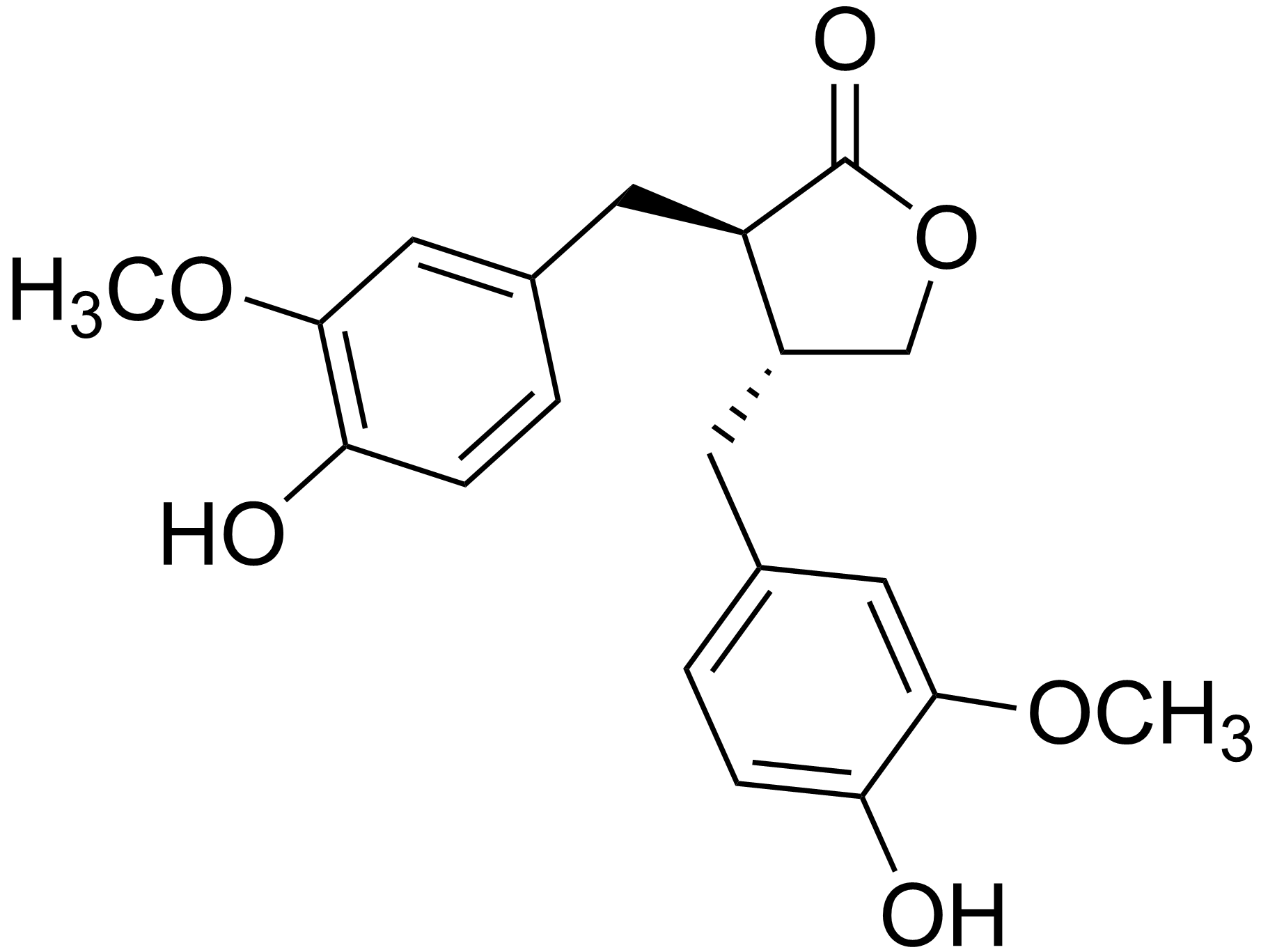
matairesinol
+ 2 NADH

This enzyme is isolated from the plants Forsythia intermedia and Podophyllum peltatum.
