= C22H18O7 =

The molecular formula C_{22}H_{18}O_{7} (molar mass: 394.37 g/mol, exact mass: 394.1053 u) may refer to:

- Justicidin A
- MT81
