= Secoisolariciresinol =

- Chemical structure of secoisolariciresinol

Names
- IUPAC name (8R,8′R)-3,3′-Dimethoxylignane-4,4′,9,9′-tetrol
- Systematic IUPAC name (2R,3R)-2,3-Bis[(4-hydroxy-3-methoxyphenyl)methyl]butane-1,4-diol
- Other names (−)-Secoisolariciresinol

Identifiers
CAS Number	29388-59-8
3D model (JSmol)	Interactive image
ChEBI	CHEBI:65004
ChEMBL	ChEMBL368347
ChemSpider	58845
ECHA InfoCard	100.045.076
EC Number	249-599-2
KEGG	C18167
PubChem CID	65373
UNII	M8QRJ7JEJH
CompTox Dashboard (EPA)	DTXSID50183615
- InChI: InChI=1S/C20H26O6/c1-25-19-9-13(3-5-17(19)23)7-15(11-21)16(12-22)8-14-4-6-18(24)20(10-14)26-2/h3-6,9-10,15-16,21-24H,7-8,11-12H2,1-2H3/t15-,16-/m0/s1 Key: PUETUDUXMCLALY-HOTGVXAUSA-N
- SMILES: COC1=C(C=CC(=C1)CC(CO)C(CC2=CC(=C(C=C2)O)OC)CO)O

Properties
Chemical formula	C_{20}H_{26}O_{6}
Molar mass	362.422 g·mol^{−1}
- Except where otherwise noted, data are given for materials in their standard state (at 25 °C [77 °F], 100 kPa). verify (what is ?) Infobox references

Secoisolariciresinol is an organic compound. It is classified as a lignan, i.e., a type of phenylpropanoid. It is present in some cereals, such as rye, and together with matairesinol has attracted much attention for its beneficial nutritional effects.

== Occurrence ==
The water extract of silver fir wood contains more than 5% of secoisolariciresinol. It is also present in nettle brew. Its content in flaxseed (Linum usitatissimum) was found to be 0.3%, which is the highest known content in food.

== Biomedical aspects ==
In the intestine the gut microflora can form secoisolariciresinol from the secoisolariciresinol diglucoside and it can then be further transformed into the enterolignan enterodiol. Epidemiological studies showed associations between secoisolariciresinol intake and decreased risk of cardiovascular disease are promising, but they are yet not well established, perhaps due to low lignan intakes in habitual Western diets. At the higher doses used in intervention studies, associations were more evident.

== Glycosides ==
- Secoisolariciresinol diglucoside
