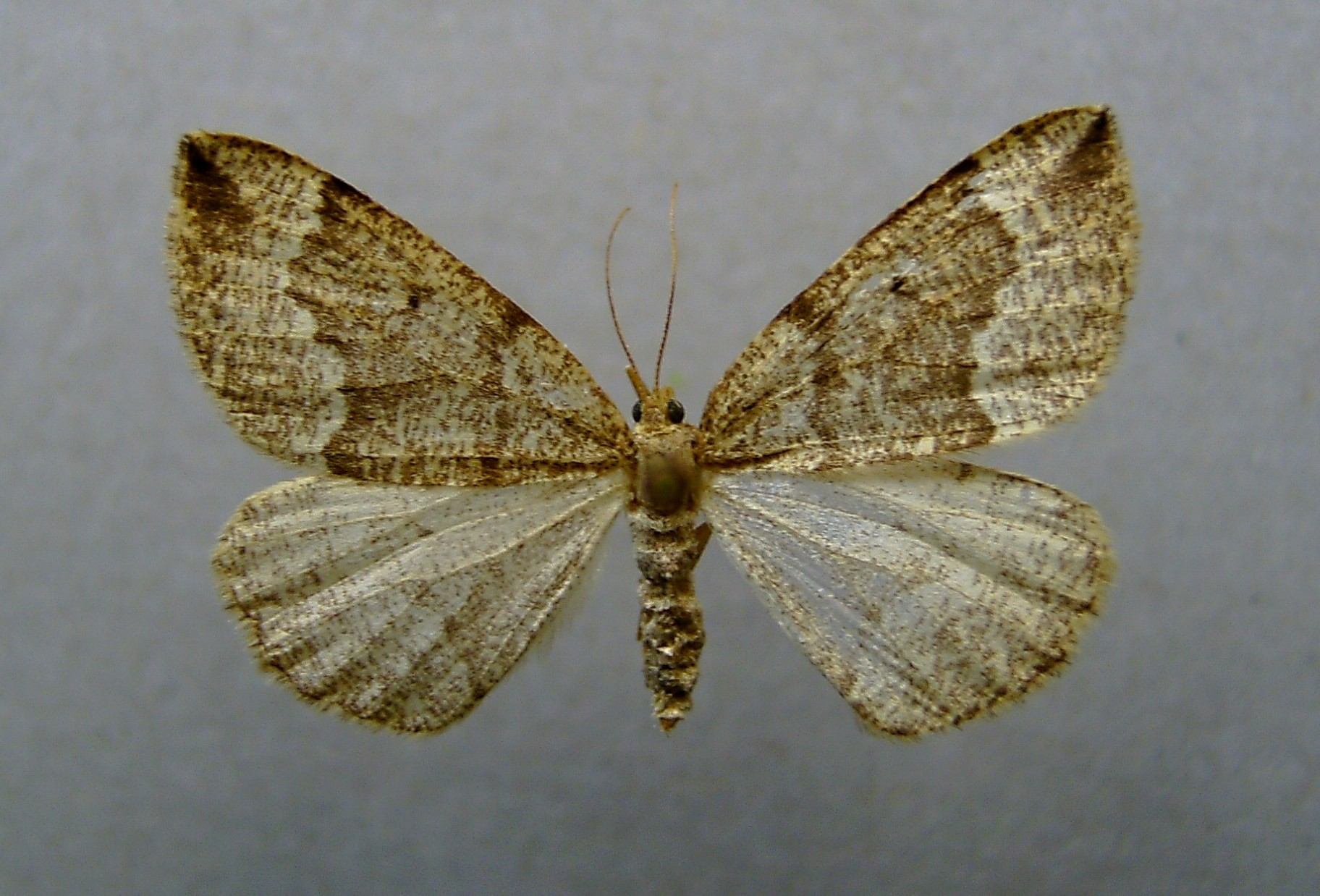

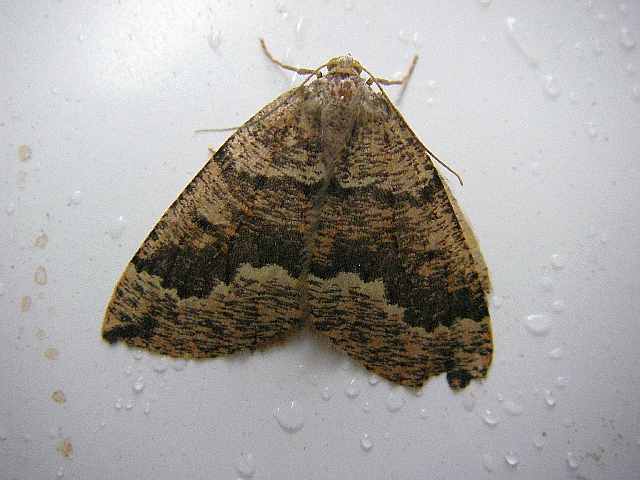

Scientific classification
- Domain: Eukaryota
- Kingdom: Animalia
- Phylum: Arthropoda
- Class: Insecta
- Order: Lepidoptera
- Family: Geometridae
- Genus: Pungeleria
- Species: P. capreolaria

Binomial name
- Pungeleria capreolaria (Denis & Schiffermüller, 1775)

Synonyms
- Geometra capreolaria Denis & Schiffermuller, 1775; Puengeleria capreolaria; Pungeleria valesiaria Vorbrodt & Muller-Rutz 1913

= Pungeleria capreolaria =

Species of moth

Pungeleria capreolaria is a moth of the family Geometridae. It is found in the mountains of southern Europe, as well as on the Balkan Peninsula and the Caucasus.

The wingspan is 30–38 mm (1.2–1.5 in). Adults are on wing from mid June to the beginning of September in one generation per year.

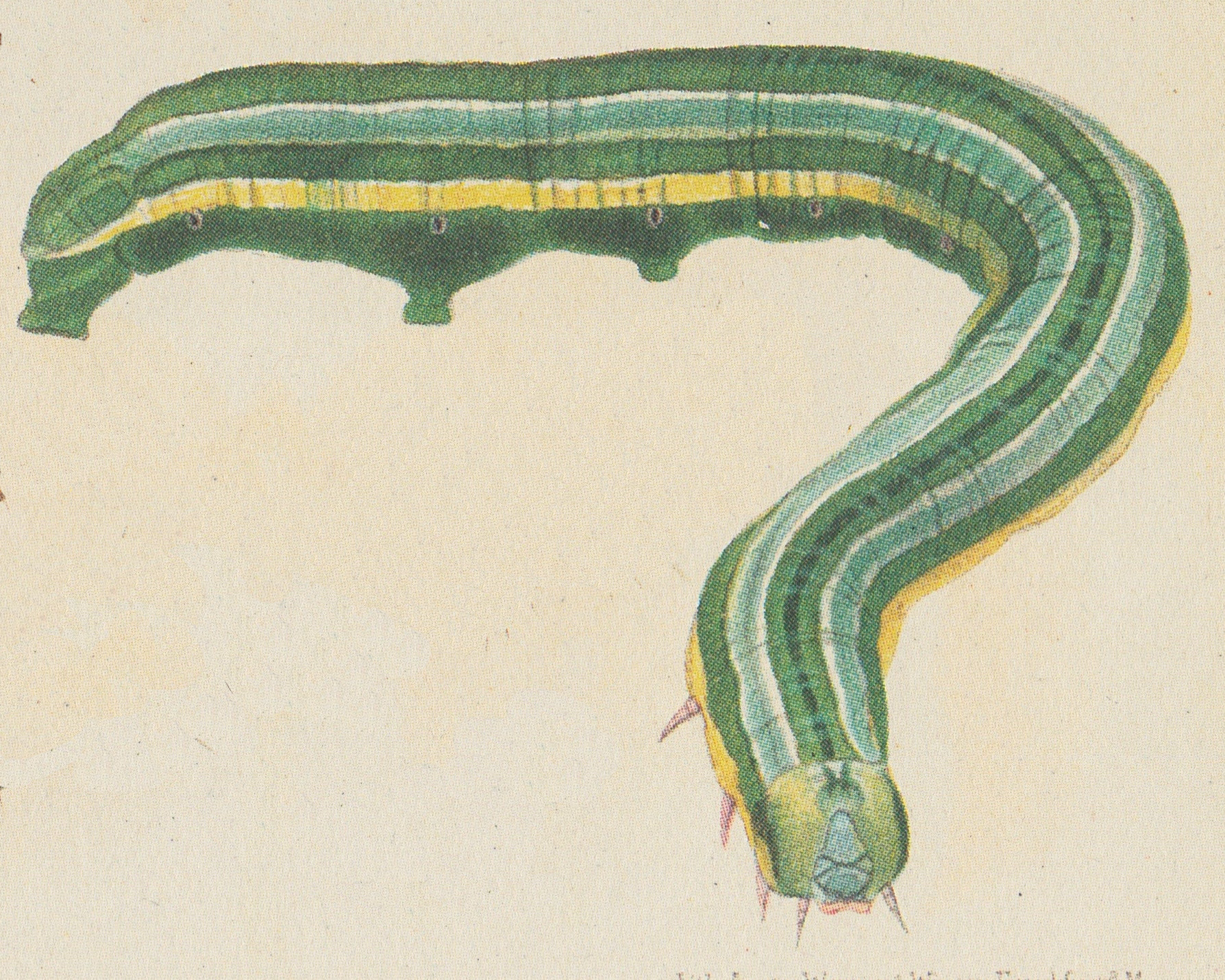
Caterpillar

The larvae feed on Norway spruce (Picea abies) and silver fir (Abies alba). The species overwinters in the larval stage.
