= NDGA =

NDGA may refer to:

- Nordihydroguaiaretic acid, an antioxidant chemical compound
- N.D. Ga., an abbreviation for United States District Court for the Northern District of Georgia
