= Abies minor =

Abies minor is a taxonomic synonym that may refer to:

- Abies minor Duhamel ex Gordon = Abies balsamea
- Abies minor Gilib. = Abies alba
