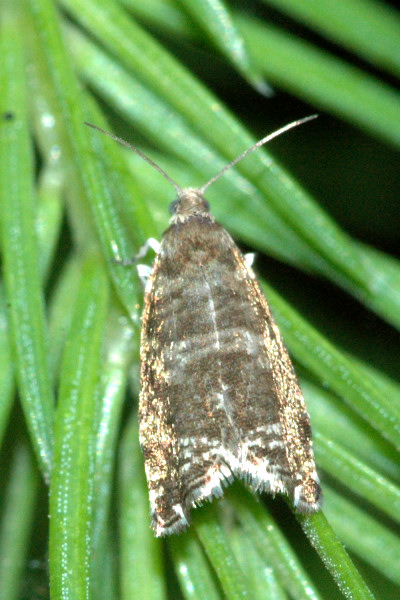

Scientific classification
- Domain: Eukaryota
- Kingdom: Animalia
- Phylum: Arthropoda
- Class: Insecta
- Order: Lepidoptera
- Family: Tortricidae
- Genus: Cymolomia
- Species: C. hartigiana

Binomial name
- Cymolomia hartigiana (Saxesen, 1840)

Synonyms
- Phalaena hartigiana Saxesen, 1840; Cymolomia faillana Fuchs, 1903

= Cymolomia hartigiana =

Species of moth

Cymolomia hartigiana is a moth of the family Tortricidae. It is found from northern and central Europe to eastern Russia, China, Korea and Japan.

The wingspan is 14–18 mm. Adults are on wing from May to August. There is one generation per year.

The larvae feed on silver fir (Abies alba) and Norway spruce (Picea excelsa).
