= Nordihydroguaiaretic acid =

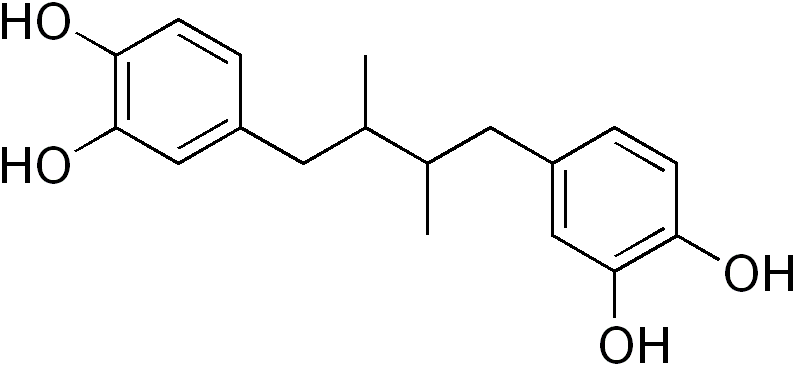

Names
- IUPAC name 4,4'-(2,3-Dimethylbutane-1,4-diyl)dibenzene-1,2-diol

Identifiers
CAS Number	500-38-9
3D model (JSmol)	Interactive image
ChEBI	CHEBI:7625
ChEMBL	ChEMBL52
ECHA InfoCard	100.007.185
IUPHAR/BPS	4265
MeSH	Nordihydroguaiaretic+acid
PubChem CID	4534
UNII	7BO8G1BYQU
CompTox Dashboard (EPA)	DTXSID5022437
- InChI: InChI=1S/C18H22O4/c1-11(7-13-3-5-15(19)17(21)9-13)12(2)8-14-4-6-16(20)18(22)10-14/h3-6,9-12,19-22H,7-8H2,1-2H3 Key: HCZKYJDFEPMADG-UHFFFAOYSA-N
- SMILES: Oc2ccc(CC(C)C(C)Cc1ccc(O)c(O)c1)cc2O

Properties
Chemical formula	C_{18}H_{22}O_{4}
Molar mass	302.370 g·mol^{−1}
- Except where otherwise noted, data are given for materials in their standard state (at 25 °C [77 °F], 100 kPa). verify (what is ?) Infobox references

Nordihydroguaiaretic acid (NDGA) is a classic lignan, a phenylpropane dimer linked by a bond between positions C8 and C8′, as opposed to a neolignan. It is a natural compound found in the creosote bush (Larrea tridentata).

== Medical properties ==
As a lignan, it is a member of one of the major classes of phytoestrogens. While it is commonly asserted that the biological properties of lignans per sé are void, and that only the enterolignans enterodiol and enterolactone, produced from lignans by intestinal bacteria have interesting biological properties, nordihydroguaiaretic acid has antioxidant and anti-inflammatory properties in vitro or in animal models. It is a redox-type inhibitor of 5-lipoxygenase.

A 1986 study involved feeding female mosquitos NDGA to test the effect on their average lifespan. While the usual mosquito life span was 29 days, the NDGA-fed mosquitos lived an average of 45 days—an increase of 50 percent. A 2008 study reported that nordihydroguaiaretic acid lengthened the lifespan of male mice, but not of female mice.

The creosote plant has been used in herbal medicine, but its use is controversial. It was widely used during the 1950s as a food preservative and to preserve natural fibers, but was later banned after reports of toxicity during the early 1960s. Recently, it has been used as a nutritional supplement; however, renal toxicity and hepatotoxicity are reported for chronic use of creosote bush and NDGA when taken internally.

== See also ==
- Masoprocol, an antineoplastic drug used to treat skin growths caused by sun exposure.
