= Enterolactone =

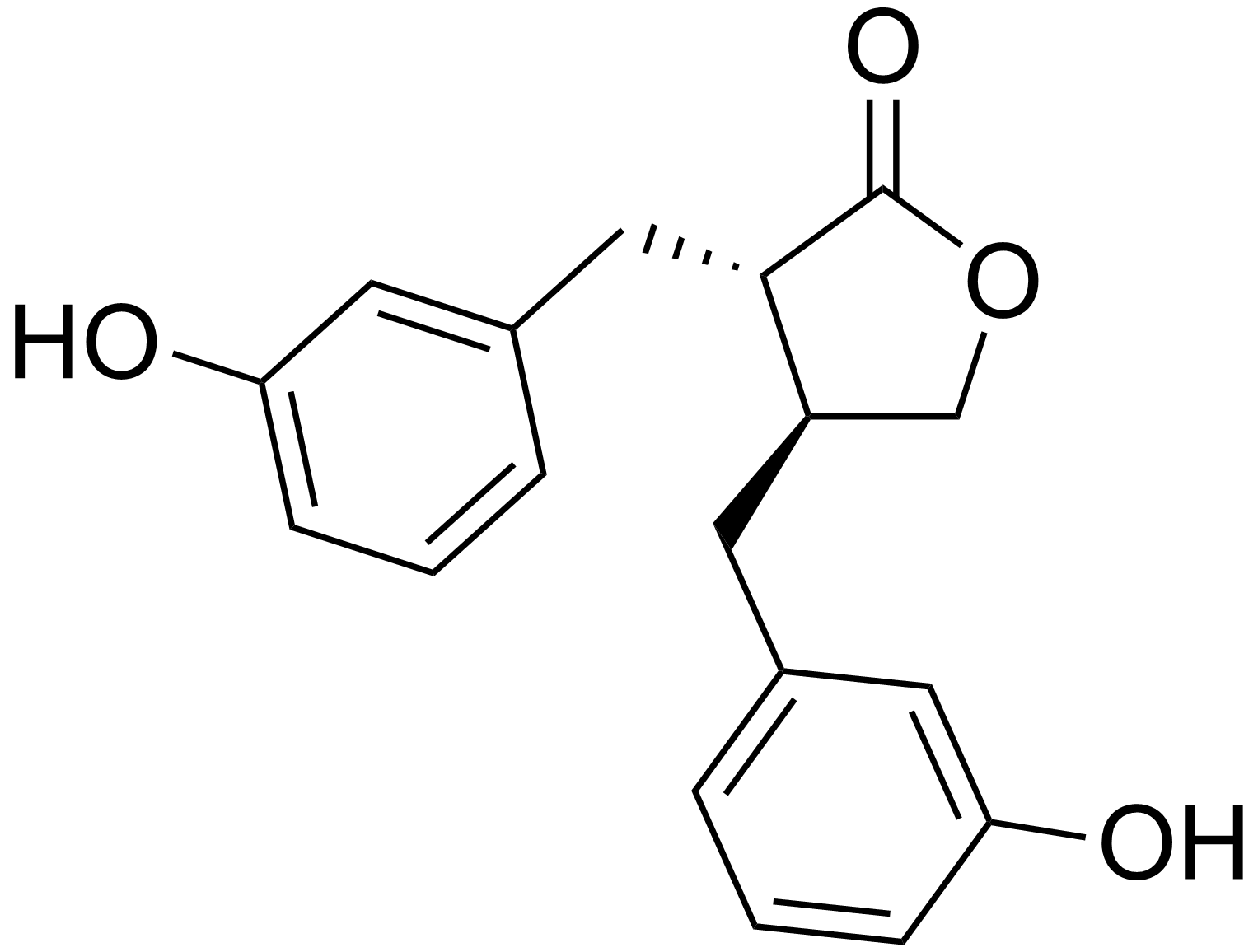

Names
- Preferred IUPAC name (3R,4R)-3,4-Bis[(4-hydroxyphenyl)methyl]oxolan-2-one
- Other names (−)-Enterolactone

Identifiers
CAS Number	78473-71-9
3D model (JSmol)	Interactive image
Abbreviations	ENL
ChEMBL	ChEMBL471475
ChemSpider	8860823
ECHA InfoCard	100.162.708
EC Number	634-756-3
KEGG	C18165
PubChem CID	10685477
UNII	X01E7E1D6H
CompTox Dashboard (EPA)	DTXSID0048183
- InChI: InChI=1S/C18H18O4/c19-15-5-1-3-12(8-15)7-14-11-22-18(21)17(14)10-13-4-2-6-16(20)9-13/h1-6,8-9,14,17,19-20H,7,10-11H2/t14-,17+/m0/s1 Key: HVDGDHBAMCBBLR-WMLDXEAASA-N
- SMILES: C1[C@@H]([C@H](C(=O)O1)CC2=CC(=CC=C2)O)CC3=CC(=CC=C3)O

Properties
Chemical formula	C_{18}H_{18}O_{4}
Molar mass	298.338 g·mol^{−1}

Hazards
- GHS labelling
Pictograms	(GHS07: Exclamation mark)
Signal word	Warning
Hazard statements	H315, H319, H335
Precautionary statements	P261, P264, P264+P265, P271, P280, P302+P352, P304+P340, P305+P351+P338, P319, P321, P332+P317, P337+P317, P362+P364, P403+P233, P405, P501
- Except where otherwise noted, data are given for materials in their standard state (at 25 °C [77 °F], 100 kPa). verify (what is ?) Infobox references

Enterolactone is an organic compound classified as an enterolignan. It is formed by the action of intestinal bacteria on plant lignan precursors present in the diet.

== Sources ==
Many dietary plant lignan precursors, such as secoisolariciresinol, matairesinol, lariciresinol, pinoresinol, and sesamin, can be metabolized by gut microbes to enterolactone. In edible plants lignans are bound to the fiber fraction and therefore fiber-rich food products, such as cereals, vegetables, fruits and berries, are generally good sources of lignans and enterolactone. The richest known dietary sources of enterolactone precursors are flaxseed and sesame seed. Since enterolactone is produced by specific species of gut microbiota, the capacity to produce it varies between people. Antibiotic treatments can abolish the capacity to produce enterolactone. It may take up to a year before enterolactone production is restored.

== Health effects ==
Enterolactone is suggested to possess beneficial health effects in humans. In epidemiological studies lower concentrations of enterolactone have been observed in breast cancer patients compared to healthy controls, which may suggest that enterolactone is anti-carcinogenic. Enterolactone and lignans may also be protective against cardiovascular disease.
