= Hydroxymatairesinol =

Names
- IUPAC name (7′S,8β,8′α)-4,4′,7′-Trihydroxy-3,3′-dimethoxylignano-9,9′-lactone
- Systematic IUPAC name (3R,4R)-4-[(S)-Hydroxy(4-hydroxy-3-methoxyphenyl)methyl]-3-[(4-hydroxy-3-methoxyphenyl)methyl]oxolan-2-one

Identifiers
CAS Number	20268-71-7
3D model (JSmol)	Interactive image
ChEMBL	ChEMBL513565
ChemSpider	9123982
PubChem CID	10948757
UNII	6F59EK4QQH
CompTox Dashboard (EPA)	DTXSID70942387
- InChI: InChI=1S/C20H22O7/c1-25-17-8-11(3-5-15(17)21)7-13-14(10-27-20(13)24)19(23)12-4-6-16(22)18(9-12)26-2/h3-6,8-9,13-14,19,21-23H,7,10H2,1-2H3/t13-,14+,19-/m1/s1 Key: UKHWOLNMBQSCLJ-BIENJYKASA-N; InChI=1/C20H22O7/c1-25-17-8-11(3-5-15(17)21)7-13-14(10-27-20(13)24)19(23)12-4-6-16(22)18(9-12)26-2/h3-6,8-9,13-14,19,21-23H,7,10H2,1-2H3/t13-,14+,19-/m1/s1 Key: UKHWOLNMBQSCLJ-BIENJYKABV
- SMILES: COC1=C(C=CC(=C1)C[C@@H]2[C@H](COC2=O)[C@@H](C3=CC(=C(C=C3)O)OC)O)O

Properties
Chemical formula	C_{20}H_{22}O_{7}
Molar mass	374.389 g·mol^{−1}
- Except where otherwise noted, data are given for materials in their standard state (at 25 °C [77 °F], 100 kPa). Infobox references

Hydroxymatairesinol (HMR) is a lignan found in Norway spruce (Picea abies). It is an enterolactone precursor with anticancer activities. In rats, HMR decreased the volume of induced tumours and stabilised established tumours, as well as preventing the development of new tumours. It has also shown anti-oxidant properties in vitro.

HMR's chemical structure is similar to matairesinol. At high concentrations, HMR has estrogenic properties, which are considerably weaker than those of estradiol.
