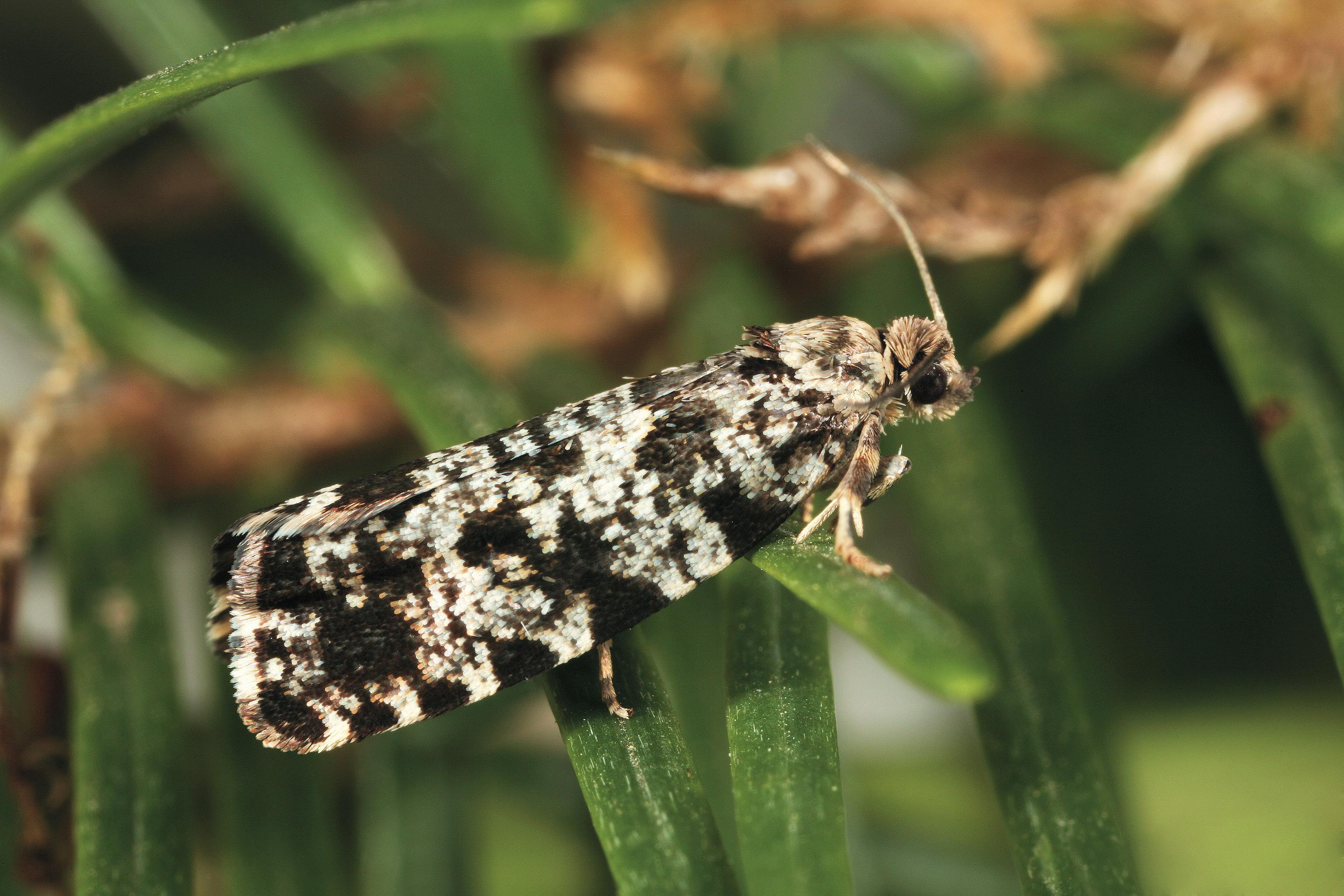

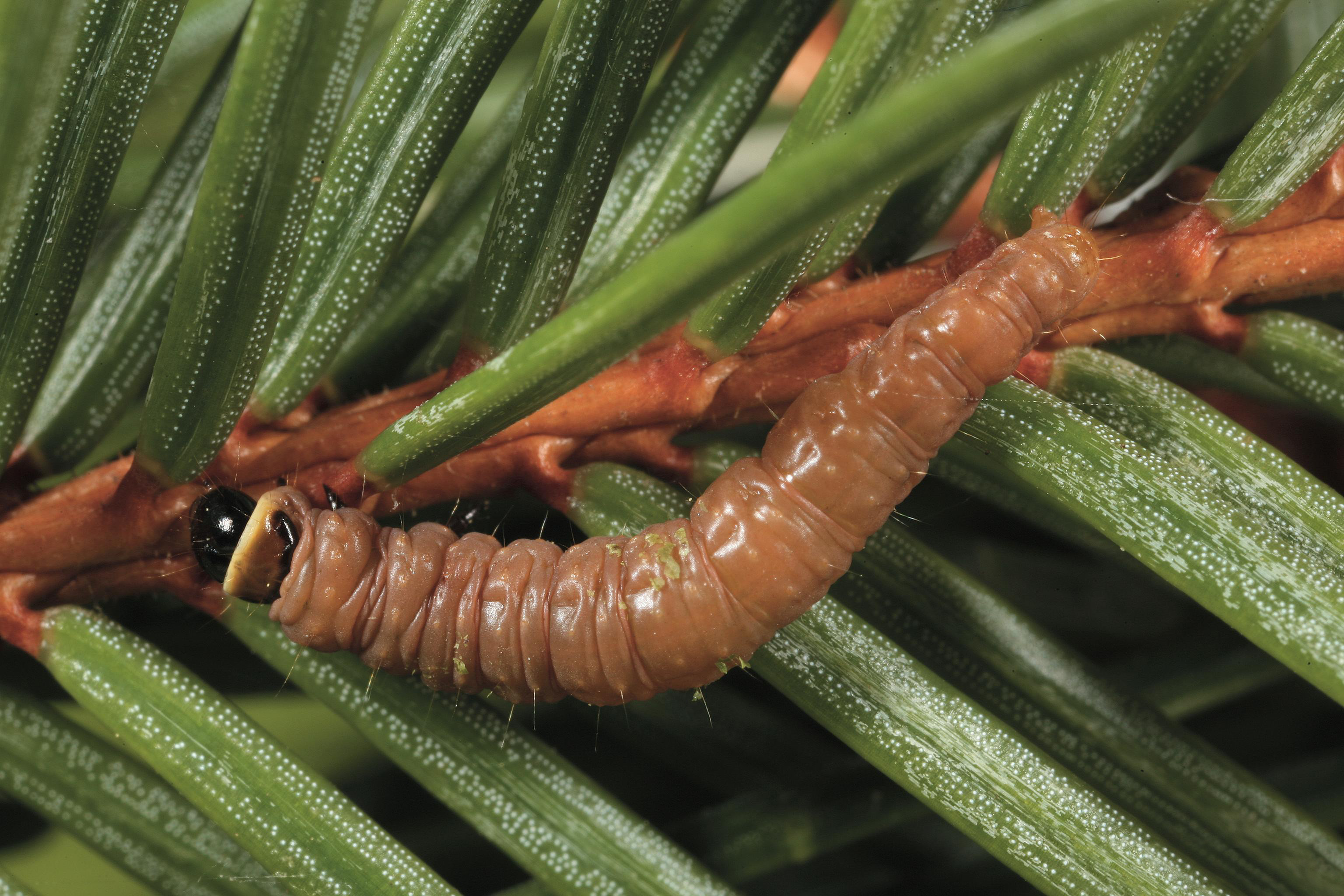

Scientific classification
- Domain: Eukaryota
- Kingdom: Animalia
- Phylum: Arthropoda
- Class: Insecta
- Order: Lepidoptera
- Family: Tortricidae
- Genus: Pseudohermenias
- Species: P. abietana

Binomial name
- Pseudohermenias abietana (Fabricius, 1787)

Synonyms
- Pyralis abietana Fabricius, 1787; Tortrix hercyniana Bechstein & Scharfenberg, 1804; Pseudohermenias hercyniana; Olethreutes hercyniana; Phalaena clausthaliana Saxesen, in Ratzeburg, 1840; Argyroploce clausthaliana; Esia clausthaliana; Tortrix (Tortrix) schmidtiana Herrich-Schaffer, 1851

= Pseudohermenias abietana =

Species of moth

Pseudohermenias abietana is a species of moth of the family Tortricidae. It is found from Fennoscandia and northern Russia to the Pyrenees, Sardinia and Italy and from France to Romania.

The wingspan is 14–18 mm. Adults are on wing from May to July in one generation per year.

The larvae feed on Abies alba and Picea abies species. They mine the needles of their host plant.
