= Wil Tower =

Swiss observation tower

Coordinates: 47°28′42.78″N 9°2′57.27″E

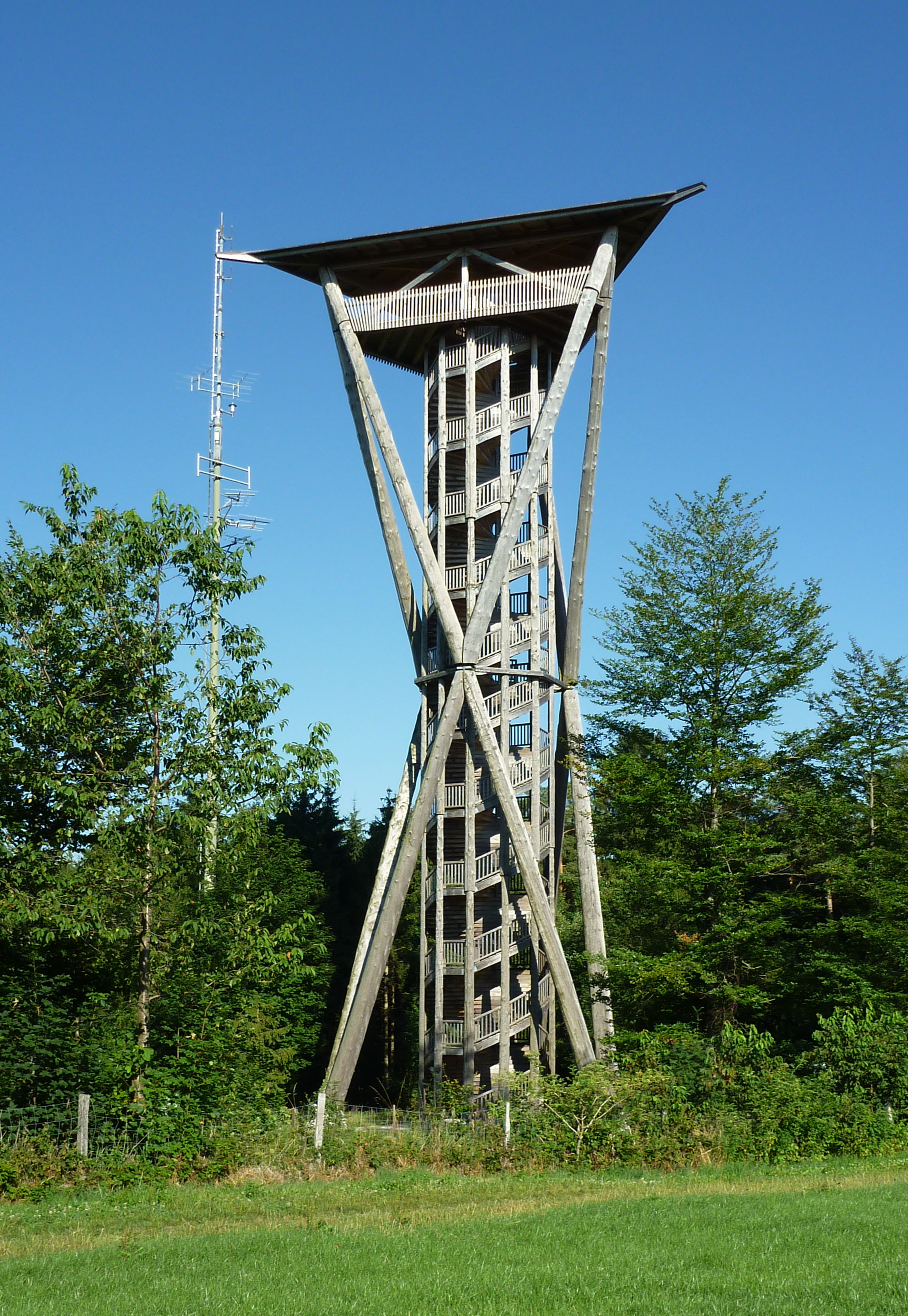
Wil tower in 2010

The Wil Tower is a wooden observation tower which was built in the forest of Wil in Switzerland by Julius Natterer. The tower site is located some 747 metres (2,451 ft) above sea level. It was opened for public use on 8 July 2006. The Wil Tower is closed for renovation work from the beginning of November 2025 until summer 2026.

== Construction ==
The tower is an open structure, rising on 6 slanted columns from three equidistant ground support points. A circular stairway (189 steps) rises in the center of the columns, opening onto a roofed observation deck. Although the structure rises some 34 metres (112 ft) above the ground, the deck is barely above the surrounding trees.

The structure is entirely of wood, all obtained from the surrounding forest. The columns are Douglas-fir and the stairway is of Silver fir. The wood was harvested in the early months of 2005 and allowed to dry naturally for a year before construction began.
