= C20H24O6 =

The molecular formula C_{20}H_{24}O_{6} (molar mass : 360.40 g/mol, exact mass : 360.157289 u) may refer to:

- Dibenzo-18-crown-6, a benzannulated crown ether
- Lariciresinol, a lignan
- Triptolide, a diterpene
