= Cymolomia phaeopelta =

Scientific classification
- Kingdom: Animalia
- Phylum: Arthropoda
- Class: Insecta
- Order: Lepidoptera
- Family: Tortricidae
- Genus: Cymolomia
- Species: C. phaeopelta

Binomial name
- Cymolomia phaeopelta (Meyrick, 1921)

Synonyms
- Argyroploce phaeopelta Meyrick, 1921

Species of moth

Cymolomia phaeopelta is a moth of the family Tortricidae. It is found in Vietnam, Thailand, India, western Java and eastern Borneo.
