= Steganotaenia commiphoroides =

Conservation status
- Near Threatened (IUCN 2.3)

Scientific classification
- Kingdom: Plantae
- Clade: Tracheophytes
- Clade: Angiosperms
- Clade: Eudicots
- Clade: Asterids
- Order: Apiales
- Family: Apiaceae
- Genus: Steganotaenia
- Species: S. commiphoroides

Binomial name
- Steganotaenia commiphoroides M.Thulin

Species of plant

Steganotaenia commiphoroides is a species of flowering plant in the family Apiaceae. It is found in Ethiopia and Somalia.
