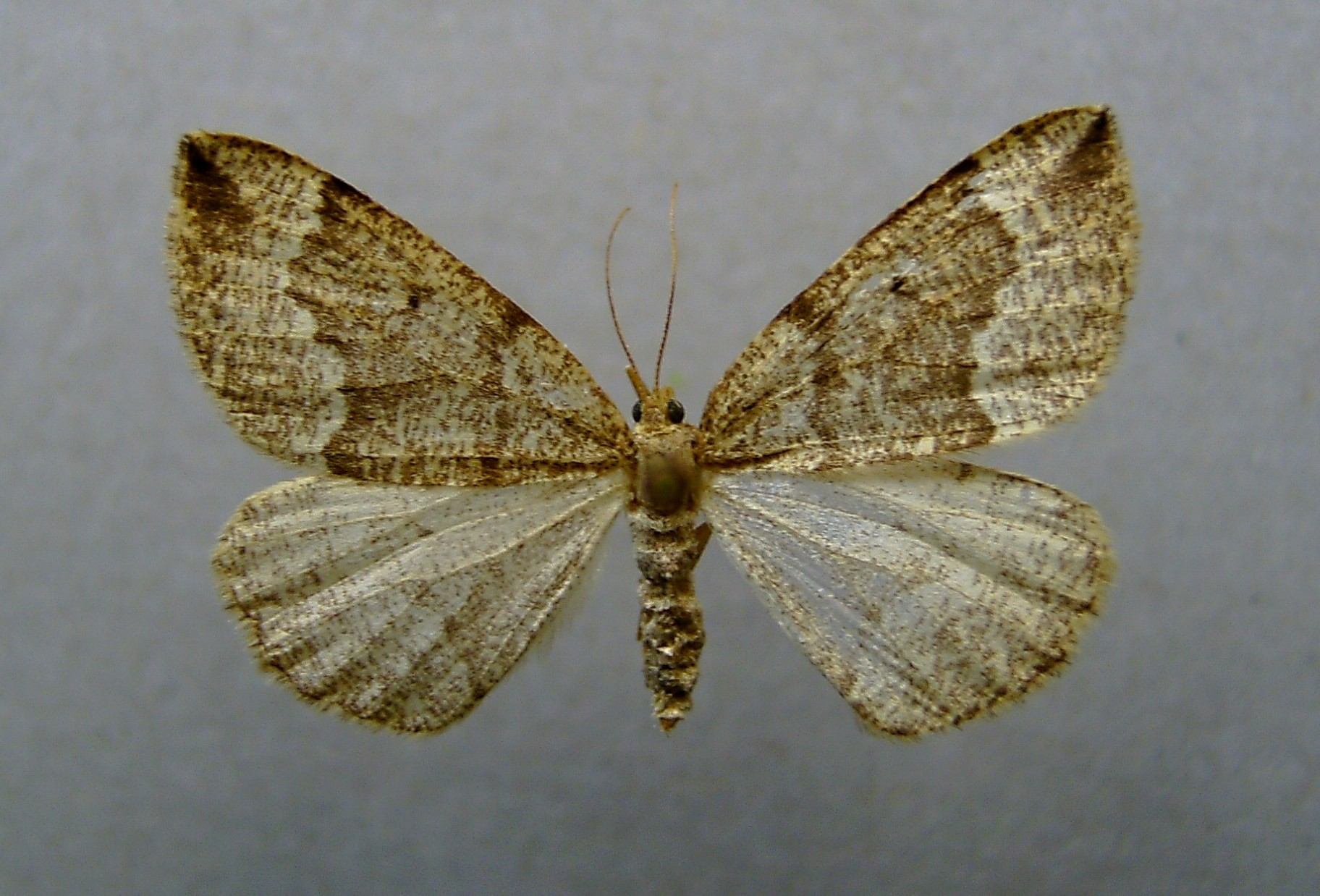
- Pungeleria capreolaria

Scientific classification
- Domain: Eukaryota
- Kingdom: Animalia
- Phylum: Arthropoda
- Class: Insecta
- Order: Lepidoptera
- Family: Geometridae
- Tribe: Campaeini
- Genus: Pungeleria; Rougemont, 1903

= Pungeleria =

Genus of moths

Pungeleria is a genus of moths in the family Geometridae described by Rougemont in 1903.

== Selected species ==
- Pungeleria capreolaria (Denis & Schiffermuller, 1775)
