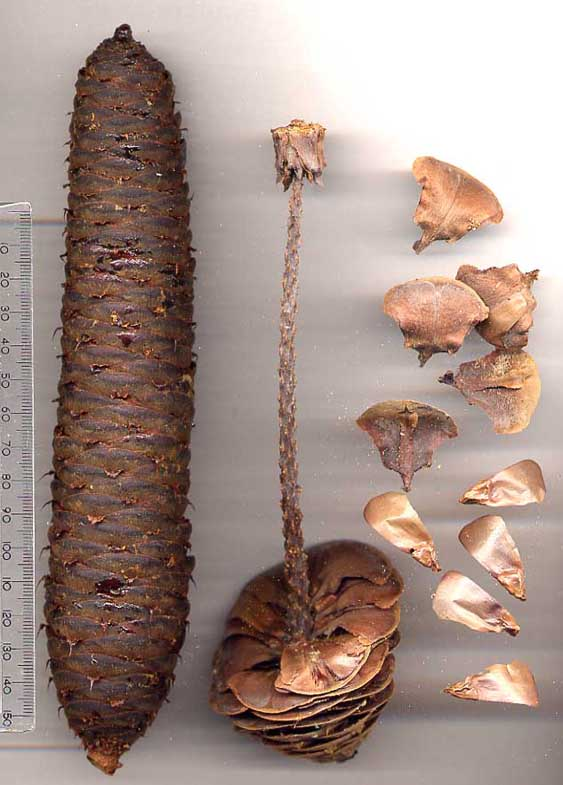
- Intact and disintegrated Bulgarian fir cones

Scientific classification
- Kingdom: Plantae
- Clade: Embryophytes
- Clade: Tracheophytes
- Clade: Gymnosperms
- Division: Pinophyta
- Class: Pinopsida
- Order: Pinales
- Family: Pinaceae
- Subfamily: Abietoideae
- Genus: Abies
- Species: A. alba × A. cephalonica
- Continuous range ✖ Isolated population

= Abies × borisii-regis =

Species of conifer

Abies × borisii-regis (Bulgarian fir) is a hybrid species of fir native to the mountains of the Balkan Peninsula in Bulgaria, northern Greece, North Macedonia and Albania. It occurs at elevations of 800–1,800 m (2,600–5,900 ft), on mountains with an annual rainfall of over 1,000 mm (39 in).

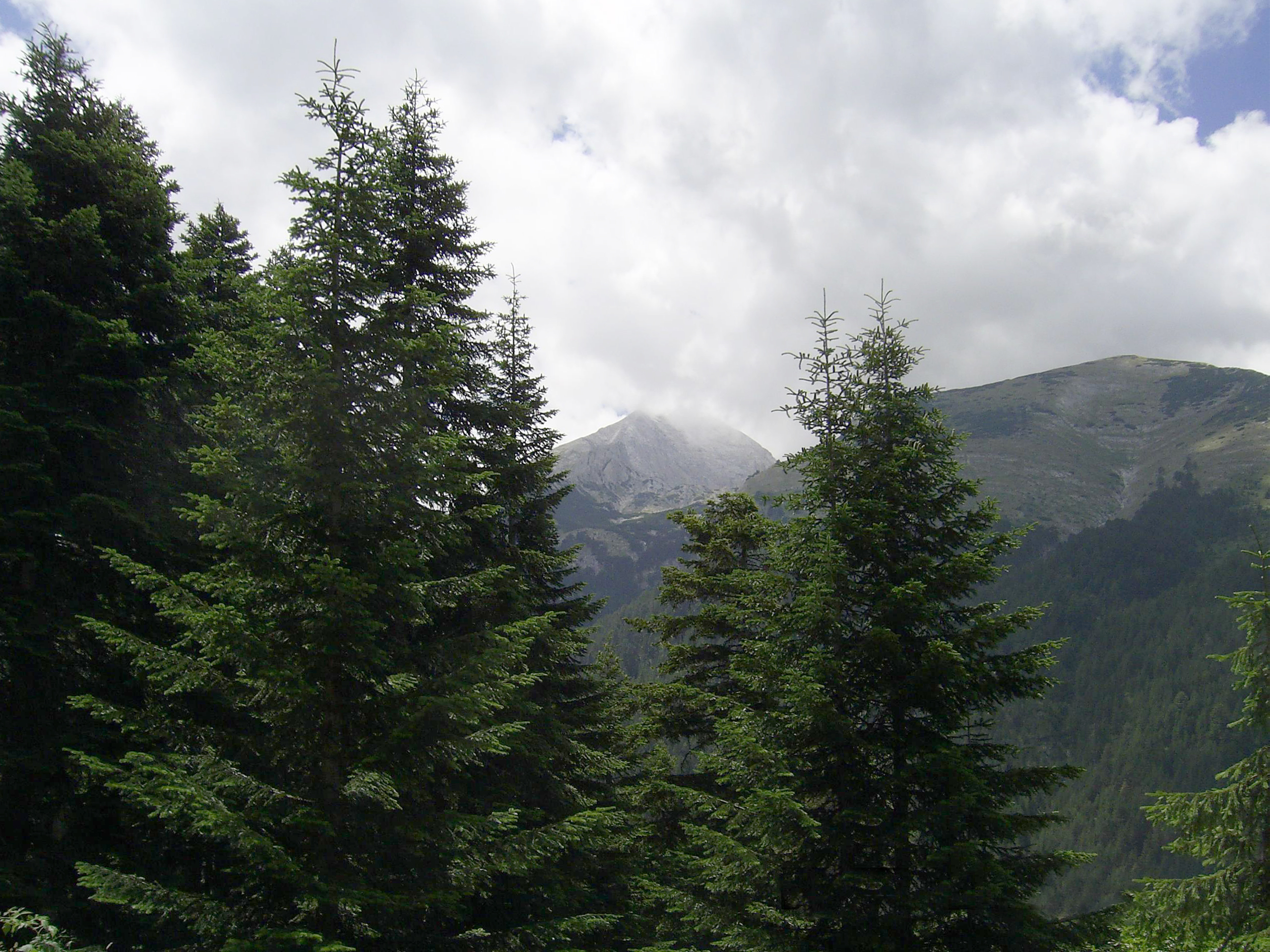
Abies borisii-regis in the Pirin Mountains, Bulgaria

It is a large evergreen coniferous tree growing to 40–50 m (130–160 ft) (exceptionally 60 m (200 ft)) tall and with a trunk diameter of up to 1.5 m (4 ft 11 in). The leaves are needle-like, flattened, 1.8–3.5 cm (0.71–1.38 in) long and 2 mm (0.079 in) wide by 0.5 mm (0.020 in) thick, glossy dark green above, and with two blue-white bands of stomata below. The tip of the leaf is variable, usually pointed, but sometimes slightly notched at the tip, particularly on slow-growing shoots on older trees. The cones are 10–21 cm (3.9–8.3 in) long and 4 cm (1.6 in) broad, with about 150–200 scales, each scale with an exserted bract and two winged seeds; they disintegrate when mature to release the seeds.

It is closely related to (and in many respects intermediate between) silver fir to the north in central Europe, Greek fir to the south in southern Greece, and Nordmann fir to the east in northern Turkey. Some botanists treat it as a natural hybrid between silver Fir and Greek fir, while others treat it as a variety of silver fir, as Abies alba var. acutifolia. Another synonym is Abies pardei.

The scientific name honours Tsar Boris III of Bulgaria, during whose reign it was described as a new species in 1925. The name is sometimes cited without a hyphen (Abies borisiiregis), though under the provisions of ICBN Article 60.9 the hyphen is to be retained.

== See also ==
- List of Balkan endemic plants
- List of organisms named after famous people (born 1800–1899)
