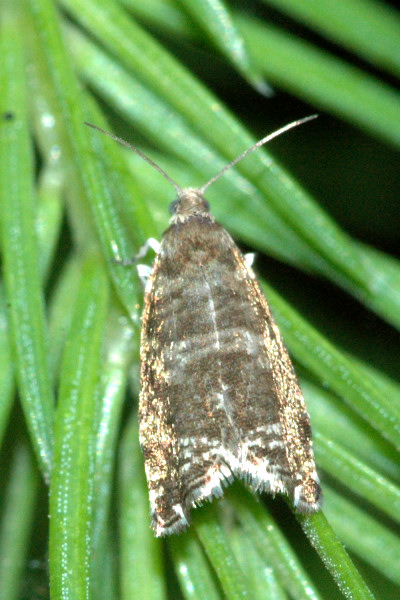
- Cymolomia hartigiana

Scientific classification
- Kingdom: Animalia
- Phylum: Arthropoda
- Clade: Pancrustacea
- Class: Insecta
- Order: Lepidoptera
- Family: Tortricidae
- Tribe: Olethreutini
- Genus: Cymolomia; Lederer, 1859

= Cymolomia =

Genus of tortrix moths

Cymolomia is a genus of moths belonging to the subfamily Olethreutinae of the family Tortricidae.

== Species ==
- Cymolomia hartigiana (Ratzeburg, 1840)
- Cymolomia jinboi Kawabe, 1976
- Cymolomia phaeopelta (Meyrick, 1921)
- Cymolomia taigana Falkovitsh, 1966
- Cymolomia vinolenta Diakonoff, 1973

== See also ==
- List of Tortricidae genera
