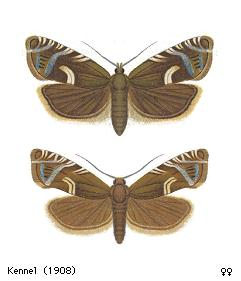
- Adult females (males look alike)

Scientific classification
- Kingdom: Animalia
- Phylum: Arthropoda
- Clade: Pancrustacea
- Class: Insecta
- Order: Lepidoptera
- Family: Tortricidae
- Genus: Cydia
- Species: C. duplicana

Binomial name
- Cydia duplicana (Zetterstedt, 1839)

Synonyms
- Several, see text

= Cydia duplicana =

Species of moth

Cydia duplicana is a small moth of the family Tortricidae. It is found in all across Europe, extending barely into Asia in the Transcaucasus, Turkestan and Kazakhstan.

The wingspan is 13–19 mm. Adults are on wing from May or June to the end of July. There is one generation per year.

The larvae (caterpillars) feed on European silver fir (Abies alba), Norway spruce (Picea abies), junipers (Juniperus) and pines (Pinus).

== Synonyms ==
Junior synonyms of this species are:

- Grapholitha duplicana Zetterstedt, 1839
- Tortrix dahliana Frolich, 1828
- Grapholitha duplicana var. graeca Staudinger, 1871
- Tortrix (Grapholitha) interruptana Herrich-Schäffer, 1851
- Grapholita dublicana [sic] ab. major Prohaska, 1922
- Laspeyresia duplicana (Zetterstedt, 1839)

In addition, the specific name interruptana was used in a list of tortrix moths by G.A.W. Herrich-Schäffer in 1848 already. But he did not provide a description then, thus the scientific name – later determined to refer to the same species as J.W. Zetterstedt's Grapholitha duplicana – was validly established by him only in 1851.
