= Arachidonate 5-lipoxygenase inhibitor =

Drug class

Arachidonate 5-lipoxygenase inhibitors are compounds that slow or stop the action of the arachidonate 5-lipoxygenase (5-lipoxygenase or 5-LOX) enzyme, which is responsible for the production of inflammatory leukotrienes. The overproduction of leukotrienes is a major cause of inflammation in asthma, allergic rhinitis, and osteoarthritis.

Examples of 5-LOX inhibitors include the pharmaceutical drugs meclofenamate sodium, zileuton and the natural products myxochelins/pseudochelin as well as nordihydroguaiaretic acid (NDGA).

Some chemicals found in trace amounts in food, as well as some dietary supplements, have been shown to inhibit 5-LOX; these include baicalein, caffeic acid, curcumin, hyperforin and St John's wort.

Acetyl-keto-beta-boswellic acid (AKBA), one of the bioactive boswellic acids found in Boswellia serrata (Indian Frankincense) has been found to inhibit 5-lipoxygenase strongly as an allosteric inhibitor. Boswellia administration has been shown to reduce brain edema in patients irradiated for brain tumor and it is believed to be due to 5-lipoxygenase inhibition.

== See also ==
- Antileukotriene agents
- Arachidonate 5-lipoxygenase ALOX5-inhibiting drugs
