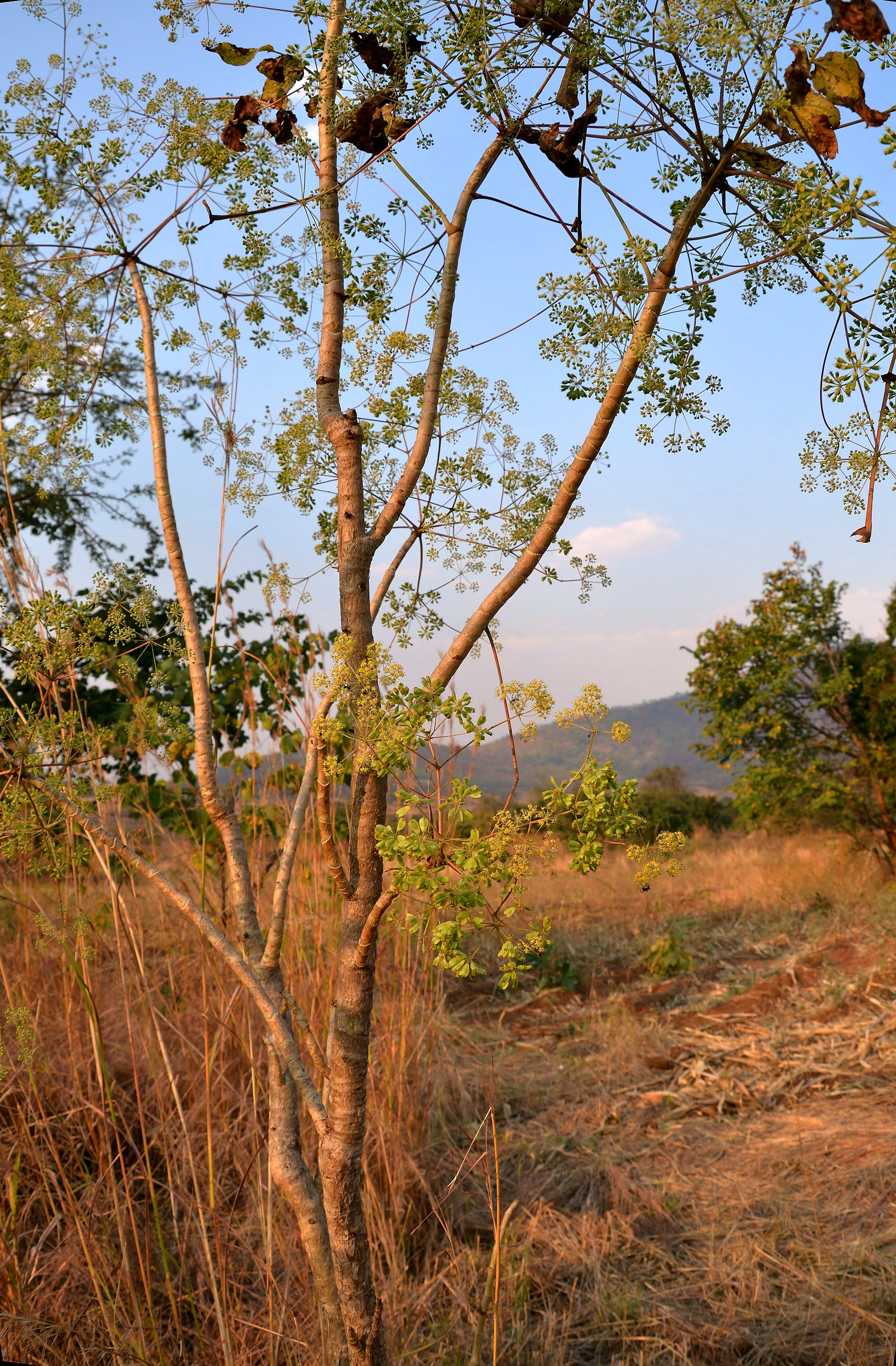

Conservation status
- Least Concern (IUCN 3.1)

Scientific classification
- Kingdom: Plantae
- Clade: Tracheophytes
- Clade: Angiosperms
- Clade: Eudicots
- Clade: Asterids
- Order: Apiales
- Family: Apiaceae
- Genus: Steganotaenia
- Species: S. araliacea

Binomial name
- Steganotaenia araliacea Hochst.

Synonyms
- Peucedanum araliaceum (Hochst.) Benth. & Hook.f. ex Vatke

= Steganotaenia araliacea =

Species of plant

Steganotaenia araliacea is a species of flowering plant in the family Apiaceae. It is found in Angola, Benin, Botswana, Cameroon, Democratic Republic of Congo, Ethiopia, Kenya, Mozambique, Namibia, Somalia, South Africa, Sudan, Tanzania, Togo, Uganda, Zambia, Zimbabwe.

== Active compounds ==
Plant contains a number of substances with antimitotic and antitubulin activity on various lines of neoplasmic cells:

- Steganacin
- Stegangin
- Steganolide A
- Steganol
- Steganone
- Epistegangin (Steganone ketone)
- Steganoate B
