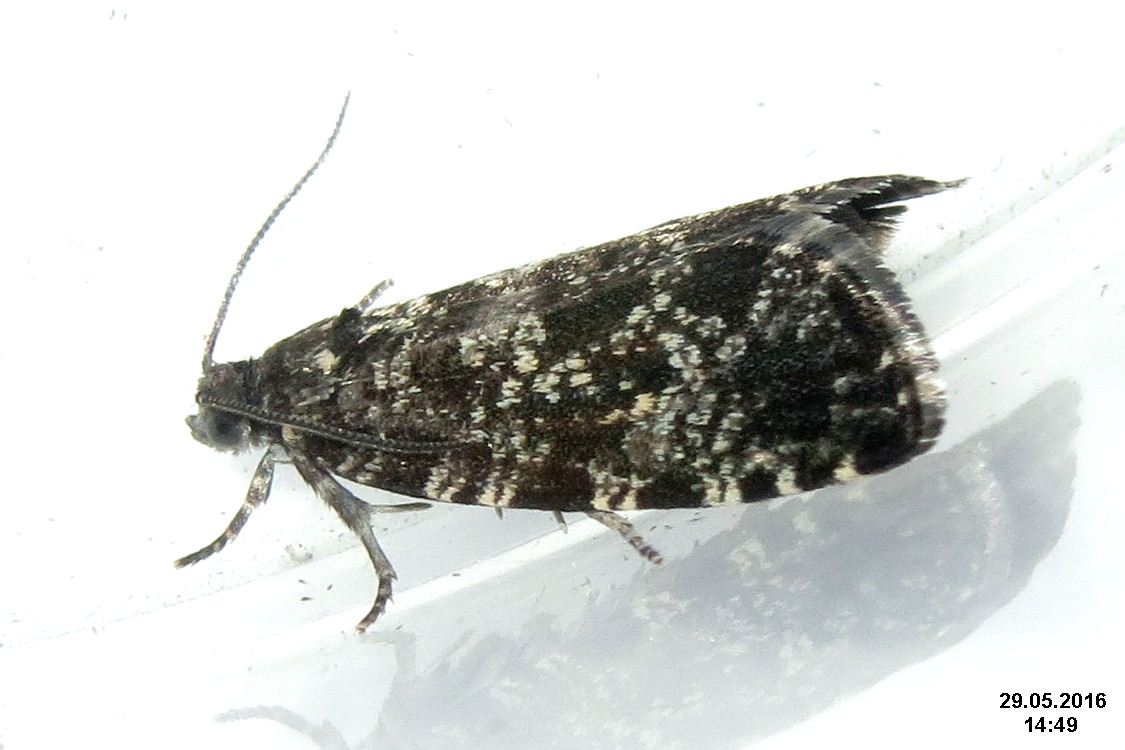
- Pseudohermenias abietana

Scientific classification
- Domain: Eukaryota
- Kingdom: Animalia
- Phylum: Arthropoda
- Class: Insecta
- Order: Lepidoptera
- Family: Tortricidae
- Subfamily: Olethreutinae
- Tribe: Olethreutini
- Genus: Pseudohermenias; Obraztsov, 1960

= Pseudohermenias =

Genus of tortrix moths

Pseudohermenias is a genus of moths belonging to the subfamily Olethreutinae of the family Tortricidae.

== Species ==
- Pseudohermenias abietana (Fabricius, 1787) (=Pseudohermenias hercyniana (Bechstein & Scharfenberg, 1804))
- Pseudohermenias ajanensis Falkovitsh, 1966

== See also ==
- List of Tortricidae genera
