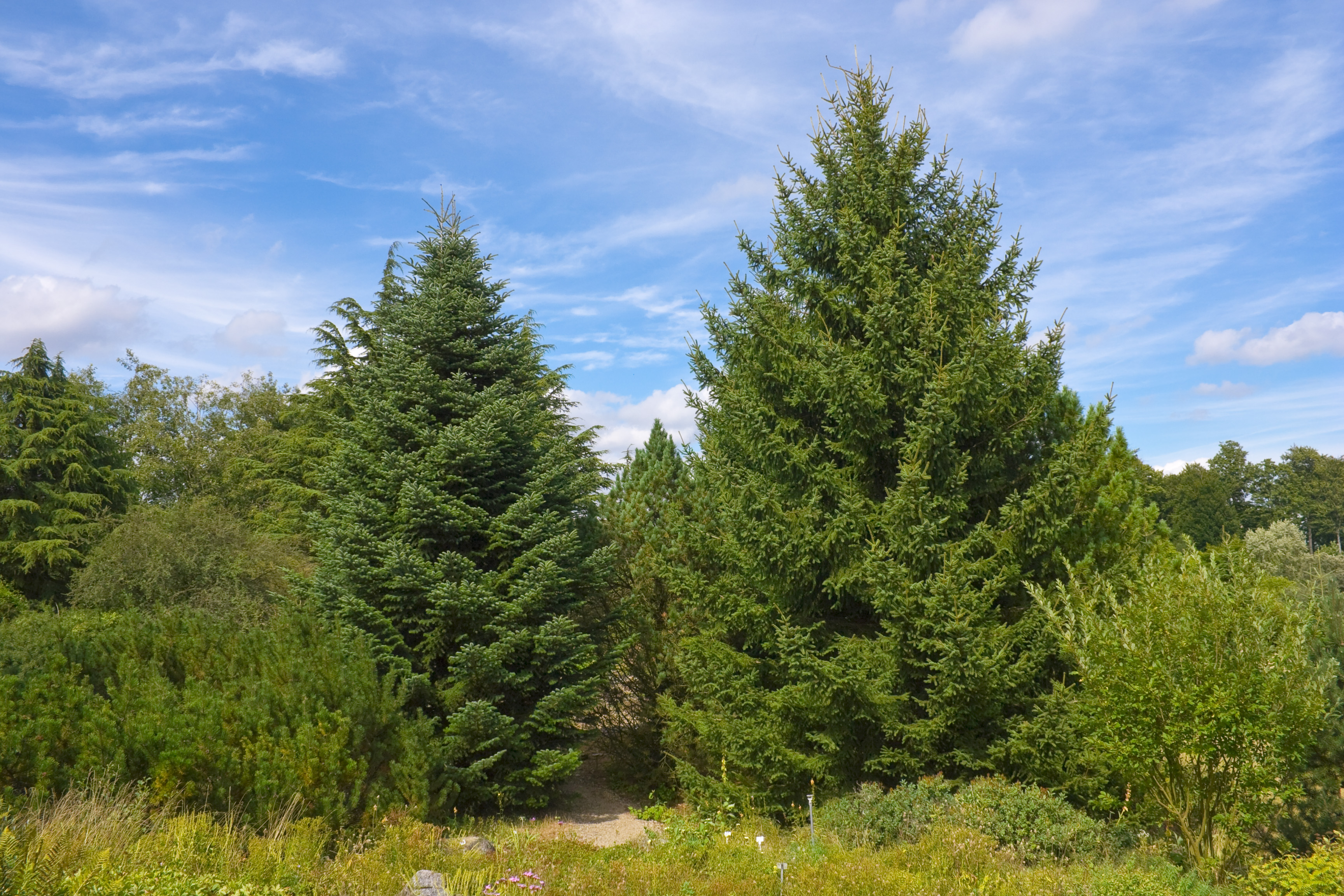

Conservation status
- Least Concern (IUCN 3.1)

Scientific classification
- Kingdom: Plantae
- Clade: Tracheophytes
- Clade: Gymnospermae
- Division: Pinophyta
- Class: Pinopsida
- Order: Pinales
- Family: Pinaceae
- Genus: Abies
- Species: A. cephalonica

Binomial name
- Abies cephalonica Loudon
- Continuous range ✖ Isolated population

= Abies cephalonica =

Greek fir

Species of conifer

Abies cephalonica, commonly known as Greek fir or Cephalonian fir, is a fir native to the mountains of Greece, primarily in the Peloponnesos and the island of Kefallonia, intergrading with the closely related Bulgarian fir further north in the Pindus mountains of northern Greece. It is a medium-size evergreen coniferous tree growing to 25–35 metres (82–115 ft) – rarely 40 m (130 ft) – tall and with a trunk diameter of up to 1 m (3 ft 3 in). It occurs at elevations of 900–1,700 m (3,000–5,600 ft), on mountains with a rainfall of over 1,000 millimetres (39 in).

The leaves are needle-like, flattened, 1.5–3.0 cm (0.6–1.2 in) long and 2 mm (0.08 in) wide by 0.5 mm (0.02 in) thick, glossy dark green above, and with two blue-white bands of stomata below. The tip of the leaf is pointed, usually fairly sharply but sometimes with a blunt tip, particularly on slow-growing shoots on older trees. The cones are 10–20 cm (4–8 in) long and 4 cm (1.6 in) broad, with about 150–200 scales, each scale with an exserted bract and two winged seeds; they disintegrate when mature to release the seeds.

It is also closely related to Nordmann fir to the east in northern Turkey.

== Ecology ==
Greek fir is near-endemic to the Pindus Mountains mixed forests ecoregion, where, along with black pine (Pinus nigra subsp. nigra) and Balkan fir (Abies × borisii-regis), it is a dominant tree in conifer forests from 1,200 to 2,500 meters elevation, and is less common in broadleaf mixed oak forests at lower elevations.

In recent years, stress from prolonged drought and higher temperatures have made trees vulnerable to predation by wood-boring beetles of subfamily Scolytinae, which disrupt the trees' ability to transport water and nutrients from roots to branches and can kill trees. Greek fir die-offs have been reported in the Peloponnesos, Ionian Islands, and the mountains of the Greek mainland.

== Cultivation and uses ==
Greek fir was important in the past for wood for general construction, but it is too rare to be of significant value now. It is also grown as an ornamental tree in parks and large gardens, though in areas that often get late frosts it is prone to frost damage, as it is one of the first conifers to open fresh growth in spring.

== Etymology ==
The generic name Abies, already used by the Latins, could, according to an etymological interpretation, derive from the Greek word ἄβιος ("long-lived"). The specific name cephalonica derives from the Greek Cephallenia and refers to the largest of the Ionian islands, which falls within the range of the species.

== Description ==
=== Carriage ===
The Greek fir has a conical shape, it rarely exceeds 25 m, even if it can reach 35 m. The branches are arranged in regular whorls and the small branches are shiny brown, close together and glabrous. Among the fir trees it is one of those with the thickest crown.

=== Leaves ===
They are 2-3 cm long, needle -like, prickly and bright green on the upper face; they have two silvery white streaks separated by a green vein below. They are arranged radially around the branches.

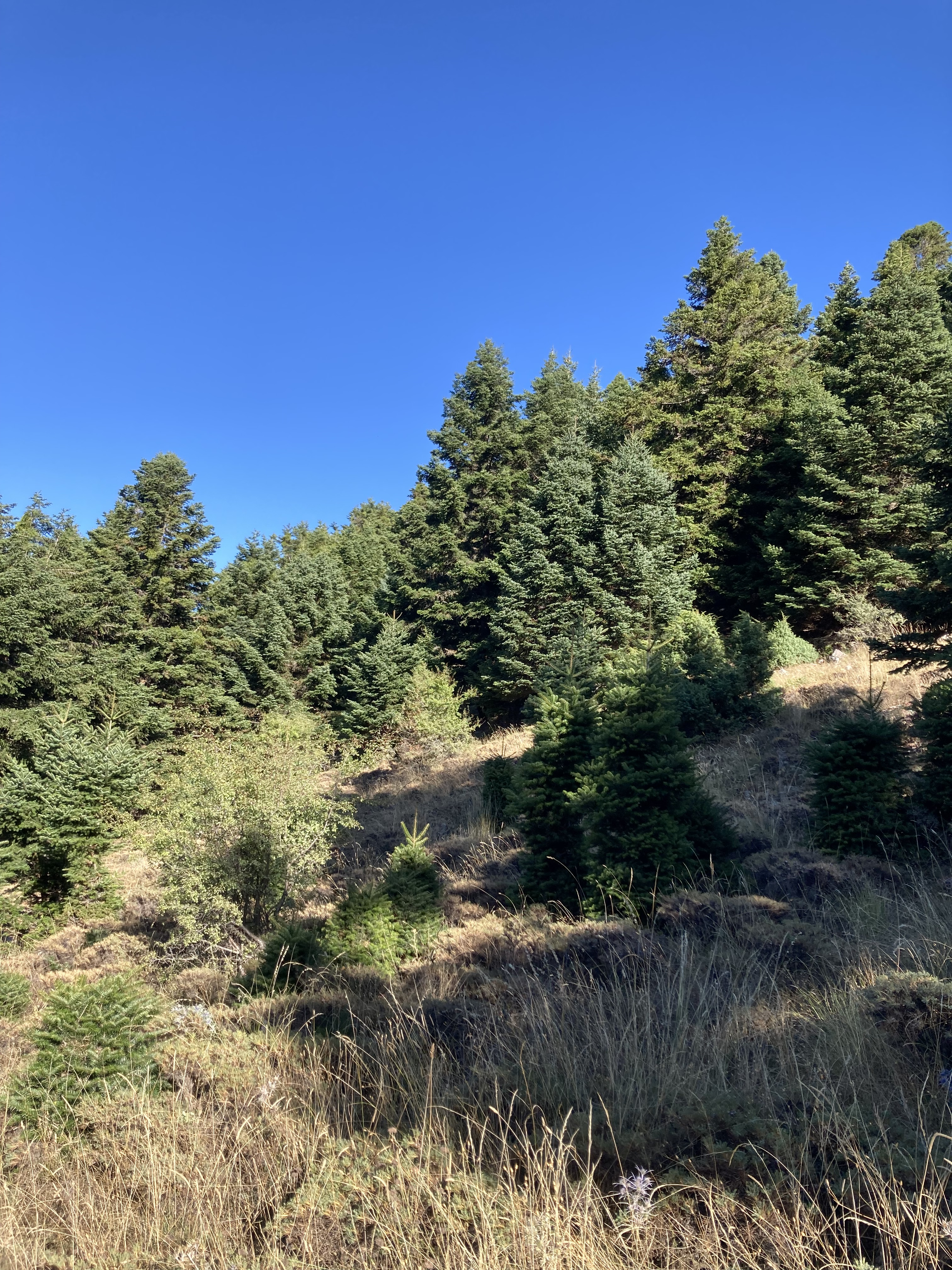
Greek firs on the slopes of Mount Erymanthos.

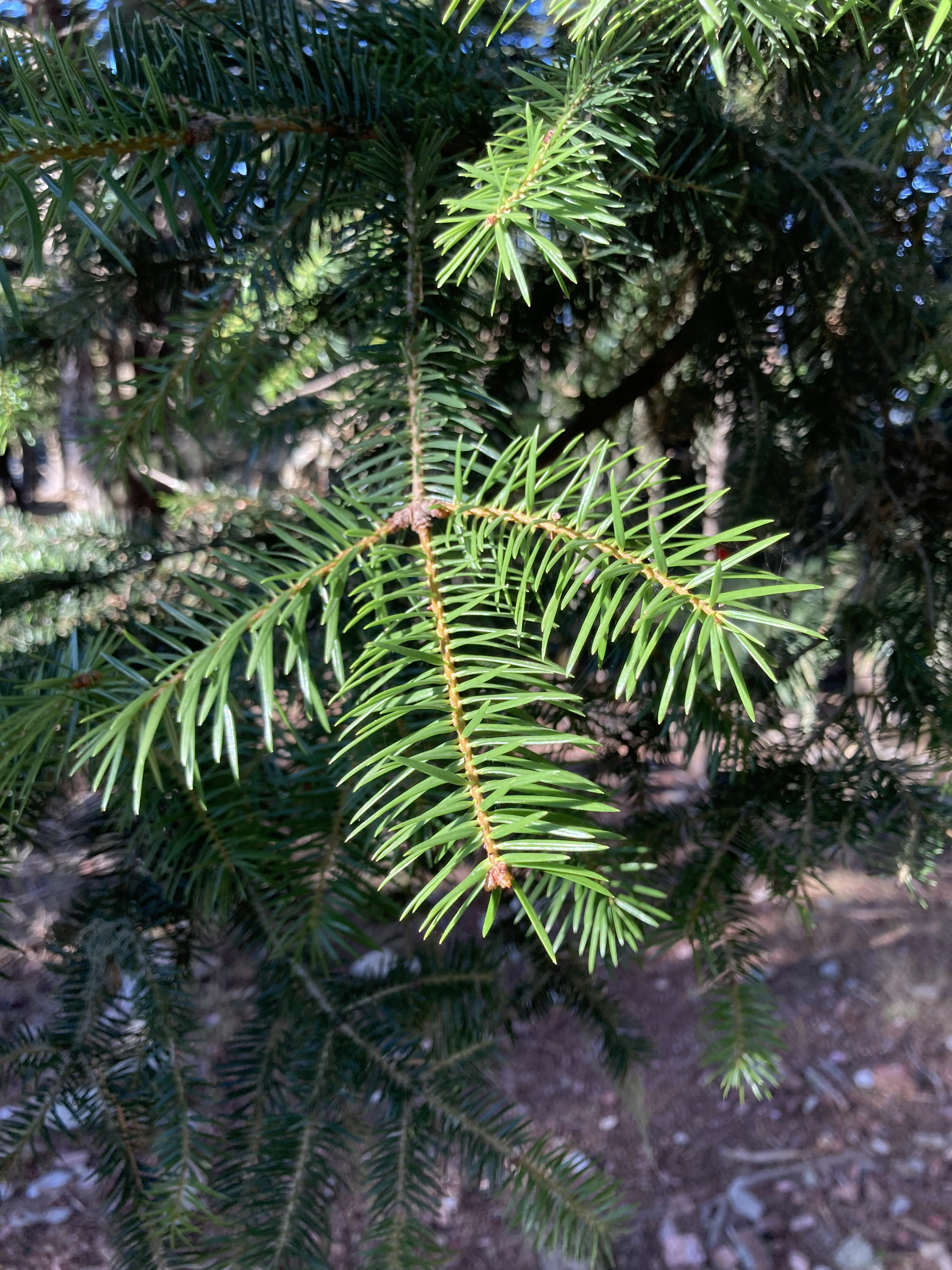
Abies cephalonica twig on Mt. Erymanthos.

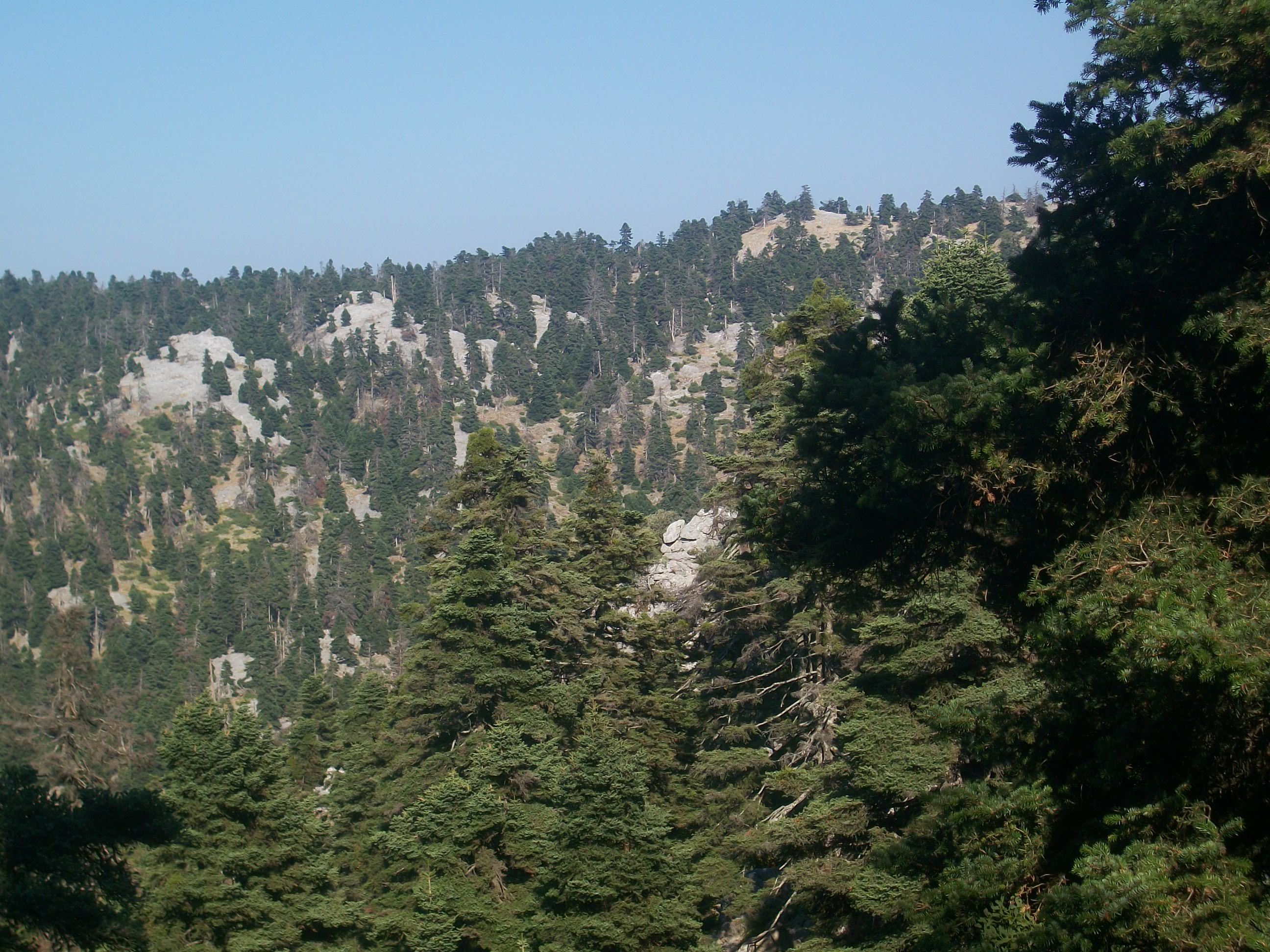
Abies cephalonica in Euboea.
