= Pseudohermenias ajanensis =

Scientific classification
- Domain: Eukaryota
- Kingdom: Animalia
- Phylum: Arthropoda
- Class: Insecta
- Order: Lepidoptera
- Family: Tortricidae
- Genus: Pseudohermenias
- Species: P. ajanensis

Binomial name
- Pseudohermenias ajanensis Falkovitsh, 1966

Synonyms
- Pseudohermenias ajaensis Oku, 1968

Species of moth

Pseudohermenias ajanensis is a species of moth of the family Tortricidae. It is found in the Russian Far East, China and Japan.

The wingspan is about 16 mm. Adults are on wing from July to August.

The larvae feed on Picea jezoensis and Abies species.
