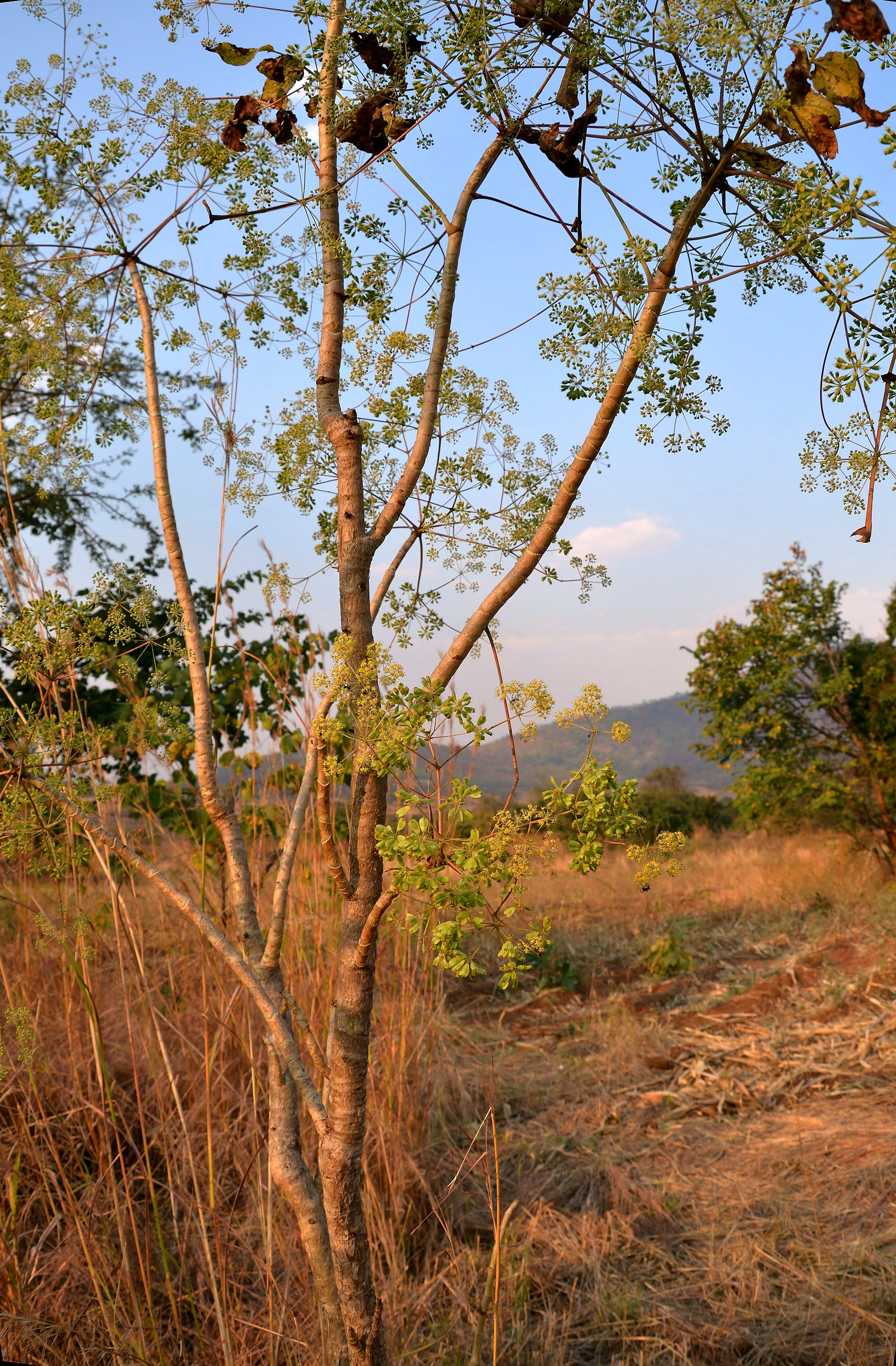
- Steganotaenia araliacea

Scientific classification
- Kingdom: Plantae
- Clade: Tracheophytes
- Clade: Angiosperms
- Clade: Eudicots
- Clade: Asterids
- Order: Apiales
- Family: Apiaceae
- Subfamily: Apioideae
- Tribe: Steganotaenieae
- Genus: Steganotaenia; Hochst.

= Steganotaenia =

Genus of plants

Steganotaenia is a genus of flowering plant in the family Apiaceae.

As of December 2022, Plants of the World Online accepted the following species:

- Steganotaenia araliacea Hochst.
- Steganotaenia commiphoroides Thulin
- Steganotaenia hockii (C.Norman) C.Norman
