= Lariciresinol =

- Chemical structure of lariciresinol

Names
- IUPAC name 4-[(2S,3R,4R)-4-[(4-Hydroxy-3-methoxyphenyl)methyl]-3-(hydroxymethyl)oxolan-2-yl]-2-methoxyphenol

Identifiers
CAS Number	27003-73-2
3D model (JSmol)	Interactive image
ChEMBL	ChEMBL518421
ChemSpider	294521
ECHA InfoCard	100.222.965
KEGG	C10646
PubChem CID	332427
UNII	73XCE5OZB0
CompTox Dashboard (EPA)	DTXSID30318362
- InChI: InChI=1S/C20H24O6/c1-24-18-8-12(3-5-16(18)22)7-14-11-26-20(15(14)10-21)13-4-6-17(23)19(9-13)25-2/h3-6,8-9,14-15,20-23H,7,10-11H2,1-2H3/t14-,15-,20+/m0/s1 Key: MHXCIKYXNYCMHY-AUSJPIAWSA-N; InChI=1/C20H24O6/c1-24-18-8-12(3-5-16(18)22)7-14-11-26-20(15(14)10-21)13-4-6-17(23)19(9-13)25-2/h3-6,8-9,14-15,20-23H,7,10-11H2,1-2H3/t14-,15-,20+/m0/s1 Key: MHXCIKYXNYCMHY-AUSJPIAWBV
- SMILES: COc1cc(ccc1O)C[C@H]2CO[C@@H]([C@H]2CO)c3ccc(c(c3)OC)O

Properties
Chemical formula	C_{20}H_{24}O_{6}
Molar mass	360.406 g·mol^{−1}
- Except where otherwise noted, data are given for materials in their standard state (at 25 °C [77 °F], 100 kPa). verify (what is ?) Infobox references

Lariciresinol is a lignan, i.e., a type of phenylpropanoids. It is the precursor to enterolignans by the action of gut microflora.

== Occurrence ==
In food, it is found in sesame seeds and in Brassica vegetables. It is also found in the bark and wood of silver fir (Abies alba).

== See also ==
- List of phytochemicals in food
