= Masoprocol =

Chemical compound

Clinical data
- Trade names: Actinex
- AHFS/Drugs.com: Micromedex Detailed Consumer Information
- Routes of administration: Topical
- ATC code: L01XX10 (WHO)

Pharmacokinetic data
- Bioavailability: Very low

Identifiers
- IUPAC name: 4-[(2R,3S)-4-(3,4-dihydroxyphenyl)-2,3-dimethylbutyl]benzene-1,2-diol
- CAS Number: 27686-84-6
- PubChem CID: 71398
- IUPHAR/BPS: 4265
- DrugBank: DB00179
- ChemSpider: 64490
- UNII: 7BO8G1BYQU
- ChEBI: CHEBI:73468
- ChEMBL: ChEMBL313972
- CompTox Dashboard (EPA): DTXSID5045178
- ECHA InfoCard: 100.044.172

Chemical and physical data
- Formula: C_{18}H_{22}O_{4}
- Molar mass: 302.370 g·mol^{−1}
- 3D model (JSmol): Interactive image
- SMILES: Oc1ccc(cc1O)C[C@H](C)[C@H](C)Cc2ccc(O)c(O)c2
- InChI: InChI=1S/C18H22O4/c1-11(7-13-3-5-15(19)17(21)9-13)12(2)8-14-4-6-16(20)18(22)10-14/h3-6,9-12,19-22H,7-8H2,1-2H3/t11-,12+; Key:HCZKYJDFEPMADG-TXEJJXNPSA-N

Masoprocol is an antineoplastic drug used to treat skin growths caused by sun exposure. It is the meso form of nordihydroguaiaretic acid that is taken by mouth. The substance is being studied in the treatment of prostate cancer.

Masoprocol is also called NDGA, and Actinex.

== Mechanism ==
Nordihydroguaiaretic acid is an antioxidant, and it may block certain enzymes needed for tumor growth.

It is a lipoxygenase inhibitor.
