= Steganacin =

- (−)-Steganacin

Names
- Preferred IUPAC name (3aS,14S,14aS)-6,7,8-Trimethoxy-3-oxo-1,3,3a,4,14,14a-hexahydro-11H-benzo[3,4]furo[3′,4′:6,7]cycloocta[1,2-f][1,3]benzodioxol-14-yl acetate

Identifiers
CAS Number	(−): 41451-68-7
3D model (JSmol)	(+): Interactive image; (−): Interactive image
ChEBI	(−): CHEBI:9259
ChEMBL	(−): ChEMBL154064
ChemSpider	(+): 264758; (−): 391322
KEGG	(−): C10886
PubChem CID	(+): 299674; (−): 443021
- InChI: InChI=1S/C24H24O9/c1-11(25)33-21-14-8-18-17(31-10-32-18)7-13(14)20-12(5-15-16(21)9-30-24(15)26)6-19(27-2)22(28-3)23(20)29-4/h6-8,15-16,21H,5,9-10H2,1-4H3/t15-,16+,21+/m0/s1 Key: XJTXBUKLGQCZHC-GCKMJXCFSA-N; (−): InChI=1S/C24H24O9/c1-11(25)33-21-14-8-18-17(31-10-32-18)7-13(14)20-12(5-15-16(21)9-30-24(15)26)6-19(27-2)22(28-3)23(20)29-4/h6-8,15-16,21H,5,9-10H2,1-4H3/t15-,16+,21+/m1/s1 Key: XJTXBUKLGQCZHC-XFQAVAEZSA-N
- SMILES: (+): CC(=O)O[C@H]1[C@@H]2COC(=O)[C@H]2CC3=CC(=C(C(=C3C4=CC5=C(C=C14)OCO5)OC)OC)OC; (−): CC(=O)O[C@H]1c2cc3c(cc2-c4c(cc(c(c4OC)OC)OC)C[C@@H]5[C@@H]1COC5=O)OCO3

Properties
Chemical formula	C_{24}H_{24}O_{9}
Molar mass	456.447 g·mol^{−1}
- Except where otherwise noted, data are given for materials in their standard state (at 25 °C [77 °F], 100 kPa). Infobox references

Steganacin is an dibenzocyclooctadiene lactone, an unusual type of lignan. It exhibits some antileukemic properties in vitro. It has been isolated from Steganotaenia araliacea. (−)-Steganacin is the natural form.
