= Saudin =

Identifiers
CAS Number	94978-16-2
3D model (JSmol)	Interactive image
ChemSpider	5293122
PubChem CID	6917902
UNII	9X6I4D5FVQ
CompTox Dashboard (EPA)	DTXSID00915201
- InChI: InChI=1S/C20H22O7/c1-11-13-8-18(12-4-7-23-9-12)26-19-10-24-15(22)16(19,2)5-6-20(27-18,17(13,19)3)25-14(11)21/h4,7,9,11,13H,5-6,8,10H2,1-3H3/t11-,13?,16-,17-,18-,19-,20+/m1/s1 Key: MIZCOUBLUGPQEO-UHMNIBCTSA-N
- SMILES: C[C@@H]1C2C[C@@]3(O[C@@]4([C@]2([C@@]5(O3)COC(=O)[C@]5(CC4)C)C)OC1=O)C6=COC=C6

Properties
Chemical formula	C_{20}H_{22}O_{7}
Molar mass	374.389 g·mol^{−1}
- Except where otherwise noted, data are given for materials in their standard state (at 25 °C [77 °F], 100 kPa). Infobox references

Saudin is a diterpenoid first isolated from the African flowering plant Cluytia richardiana.

Saudin has shown a hypoglycemic effect in an rodent model experiment.

Because of the unusual chemical structure and its potential biological activity, there has been research aimed at its total synthesis.
