= MT81 =

Names
- IUPAC name 1,5-Dihydroxy-3-methyl-8-(2,6,7,7a-tetrahydro-4H-furo[3,2-c]pyran-4-yloxy)-9,10-anthraquinone

Identifiers
CAS Number	93513-59-8
3D model (JSmol)	Interactive image
ChemSpider	129161
PubChem CID	146437
CompTox Dashboard (EPA)	DTXSID60918359
- InChI: InChI=1S/C22H18O7/c1-10-8-12-17(14(24)9-10)21(26)19-16(3-2-13(23)18(19)20(12)25)29-22-11-4-6-27-15(11)5-7-28-22/h2-4,8-9,15,22-24H,5-7H2,1H3 Key: TUSQXSZBOGDCBU-UHFFFAOYSA-N; InChI=1/C22H18O7/c1-10-8-12-17(14(24)9-10)21(26)19-16(3-2-13(23)18(19)20(12)25)29-22-11-4-6-27-15(11)5-7-28-22/h2-4,8-9,15,22-24H,5-7H2,1H3 Key: TUSQXSZBOGDCBU-UHFFFAOYAB
- SMILES: O=C4c3c(O)ccc(OC/1OCCC2OC/C=C\12)c3C(=O)c5c4cc(cc5O)C

Properties
Chemical formula	C_{22}H_{18}O_{7}
Molar mass	394.379 g·mol^{−1}
- Except where otherwise noted, data are given for materials in their standard state (at 25 °C [77 °F], 100 kPa). Infobox references

MT81 is a mycotoxin with antibiotic activity.
