= Secoisolariciresinol diglucoside =

Antioxidant phytoestrogen

- Chemical structure of SDG

Names
- IUPAC name (8R,8′R)-4,4′-Dihydroxy-3,3′-dimethoxylignane-9,9′-diyl di(β-D-glucopyranoside)
- Systematic IUPAC name (2R,2′R,3R,3′R,4S,4′S,5S,5′S,6R,6′R)-2,2′-[{(2R,3R)-2,3-Bis[(4-hydroxy-3-methoxyphenyl)methyl]butane-1,4-diyl}bis(oxy)]bis[6-(hydroxymethyl)oxane-3,4,5-triol]
- Other names SDG

Identifiers
CAS Number	158932–33–3
3D model (JSmol)	Interactive image
ChemSpider	8093627
KEGG	C22584
PubChem CID	9917980
UNII	T9281L29MV
CompTox Dashboard (EPA)	DTXSID40432760
- InChI: InChI=1S/C32H46O16/c1-43-21-9-15(3-5-19(21)35)7-17(13-45-31-29(41)27(39)25(37)23(11-33)47-31)18(8-16-4-6-20(36)22(10-16)44-2)14-46-32-30(42)28(40)26(38)24(12-34)48-32/h3-6,9-10,17-18,23-42H,7-8,11-14H2,1-2H3/t17-,18-,23+,24+,25+,26+,27-,28-,29+,30+,31+,32+/m0/s1 Key: SBVBJPHMDABKJV-PGCJWIIOSA-N; InChI=1/C32H46O16/c1-43-21-9-15(3-5-19(21)35)7-17(13-45-31-29(41)27(39)25(37)23(11-33)47-31)18(8-16-4-6-20(36)22(10-16)44-2)14-46-32-30(42)28(40)26(38)24(12-34)48-32/h3-6,9-10,17-18,23-42H,7-8,11-14H2,1-2H3/t17-,18-,23+,24+,25+,26+,27-,28-,29+,30+,31+,32+/m0/s1 Key: SBVBJPHMDABKJV-PGCJWIIOBK
- SMILES: OC1=C(OC)C=C(C[C@H]([C@H](CO[C@H]2[C@H](O)[C@@H](O)[C@H](O)[C@@H](CO)O2)CC3=CC(OC)=C(O)C=C3)CO[C@H]4[C@H](O)[C@@H](O)[C@H](O)[C@@H](CO)O4)C=C1

Properties
Chemical formula	C_{32}H_{46}O_{16}
Molar mass	686.704 g·mol^{−1}
- Except where otherwise noted, data are given for materials in their standard state (at 25 °C [77 °F], 100 kPa). verify (what is ?) Infobox references

Secoisolariciresinol diglucoside (SDG) is an antioxidant phytoestrogen present in flax, sunflower, sesame, and pumpkin seeds. In food, it can be found in commercial breads containing flaxseed. It is a precursor of mammal lignans which are produced in the colon from chemicals in foods.

== Extraction ==
Secoisolariciresinol diglucoside can be isolated from de-fatted (hexane extraction) flaxseed by extraction of the lignan polymer precursor with a water/acetone mixture, followed by acetone removal and alkaline hydrolysis.

== Studies on biological effects ==
Secoisolariciresinol diglucoside slows the growth of human breast cancer in mice.

Secoisolariciresinol diglucoside may be manipulated by different CYP enzymes in Eukaryotes. Due to its inherent size of 687Da, it will not pass the blood–brain barrier (which is somewhat limited to molecules smaller than 500Da).

In one histology group of adult patients with Grade IV malignant glioma, consuming secoisolariciresinol is associated with poorer survival outcomes, while for Grade III patients it is associated with more positive outcomes.

In rabbits, SDG reduced hypercholesterolemic atherosclerosis and this effect was associated with a decrease in serum cholesterol, LDL-C, and lipid peroxidation product and an increase in HDL-C and antioxidant reserve.

SDG has been shown to counter oxidative stress in human colonic epithelial tissue and protect against mtDNA damage in vitro, by H_{2}O_{2} exposure, in a dose-dependent manner, and counters (in-vitro) oxidative stress on heart cells caused by Iron overload.
