= Justicidin A =

Names
- Preferred IUPAC name 9-(2H-1,3-Benzodioxol-5-yl)-4,6,7-trimethoxynaptho[2,3-c]furan-1(3H)-one
- Other names Diphyllin methyl ether

Identifiers
| CAS Number | 25001-57-4 |
| 3D model (JSmol) | Interactive image |
| ChEBI | CHEBI:6093 |
| ChEMBL | ChEMBL508532 |
| ChemSpider | 140644 |
| KEGG | C10633 |
| PubChem CID | 159982 |
| UNII | Q58EXN1G4M |
| CompTox Dashboard (EPA) | DTXSID40179709 |
- InChI: InChI=1S/C22H18O7/c1-24-16-7-12-13(8-17(16)25-2)21(26-3)14-9-27-22(23)20(14)19(12)11-4-5-15-18(6-11)29-10-28-15/h4-8H,9-10H2,1-3H3 Key: ANFSXHKDCKWWDB-UHFFFAOYSA-N
- SMILES: COC1=C(C=C2C(=C1)C(=C3C(=C2OC)COC3=O)C4=CC5=C(C=C4)OCO5)OC

Properties
| Chemical formula | C_{22}H_{18}O_{7} |
| Molar mass | 394.379 g·mol^{−1} |
- Except where otherwise noted, data are given for materials in their standard state (at 25 °C [77 °F], 100 kPa). Infobox references

Justicidin A is an organic compound isolated from Justicia procumbens. It is classified as a lignan. The compound may possess cytotoxic effects.
