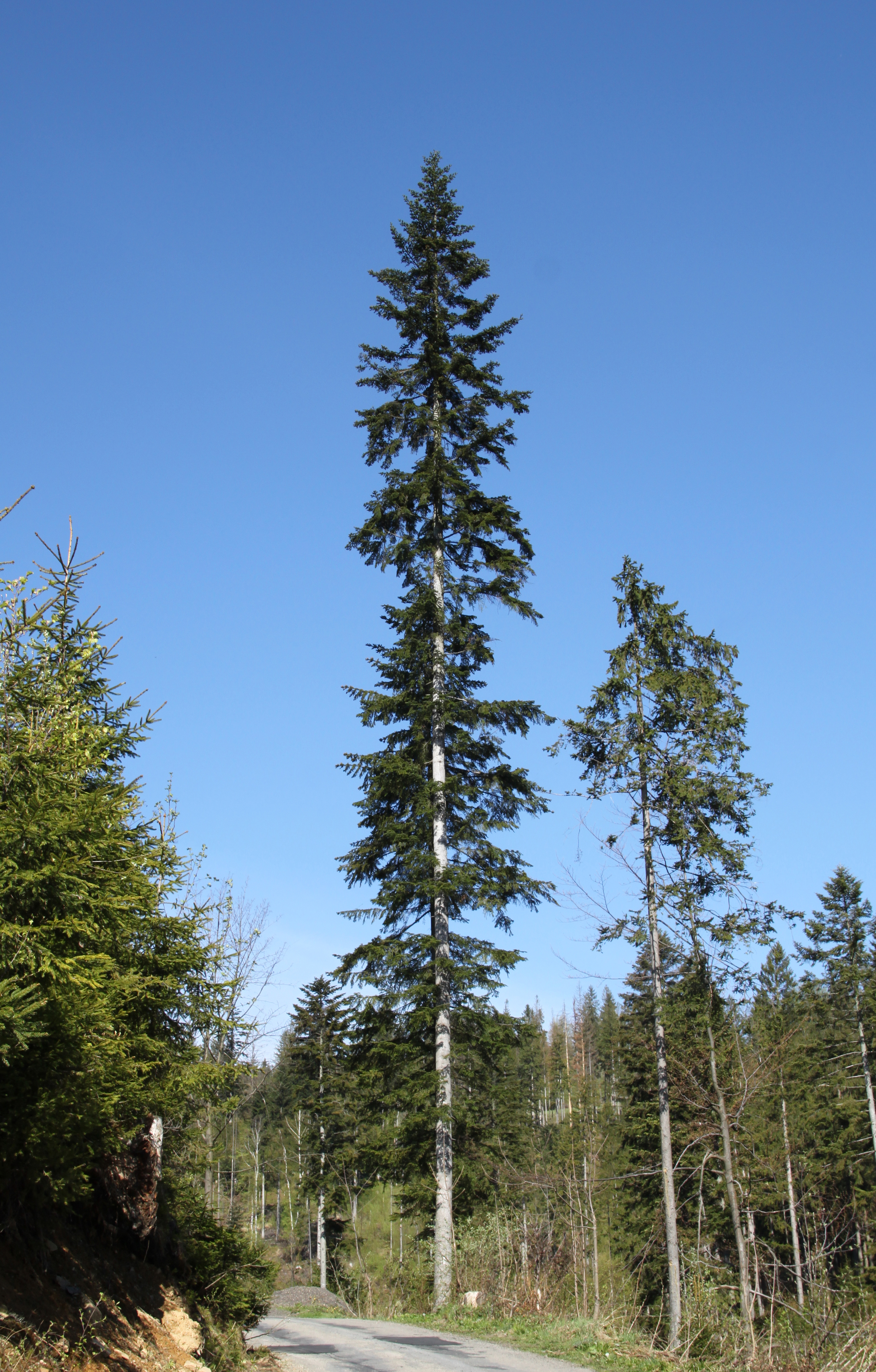
- In Silesian Beskids, Poland

Conservation status
- Least Concern (IUCN 3.1)

Scientific classification
- Kingdom: Plantae
- Clade: Tracheophytes
- Clade: Gymnosperms
- Division: Pinophyta
- Class: Pinopsida
- Order: Pinales
- Family: Pinaceae
- Genus: Abies
- Species: A. alba

Binomial name
- Abies alba Mill.
- Native range ✖ Isolated population Introduced and naturalized (synanthropic) area ▲ Isolated population

Synonyms
- List: Abies argentea Chambray; Abies baldensis (Zuccagni) Zucc. ex Nyman; Abies candicans Fisch. ex Endl.; Abies chlorocarpa Purk. ex Nyman; Abies duplex Hormuz. ex Beissn.; Abies metensis Gordon; Abies miniata Knight ex Gordon; Abies minor Gilib.; Abies nobilis A.Dietr.; Abies pardei Gaussen; Abies rinzii K.Koch; Abies taxifolia Duhamel; Abies taxifolia Desf.; Abies taxifolia Raf.; Abies tenuirifolia Beissn.; Abies vulgaris Poir.; Peuce abies Rich.; Picea kukunaria Wender.; Picea metensis Gordon; Picea pectinata (Lam.) Loudon; Picea pyramidalis Gordon; Picea rinzi Gordon; Picea tenuifolia Beissn.; Pinus baldensis Zuccagni; Pinus heterophylla K.Koch; Pinus lucida Salisb.; Pinus pectinata Lam.; Pinus picea L.

= Abies alba =

Silver fir

Species of conifer tree

Abies alba, the European silver fir or silver fir, is a fir native to the mountains of Europe, from the Pyrenees north to Normandy, east to the Alps and the Carpathians, Slovakia, Slovenia, Croatia, Bosnia and Herzegovina, Montenegro, Serbia, and south to Italy, Bulgaria, Kosovo, Albania and northern Greece.

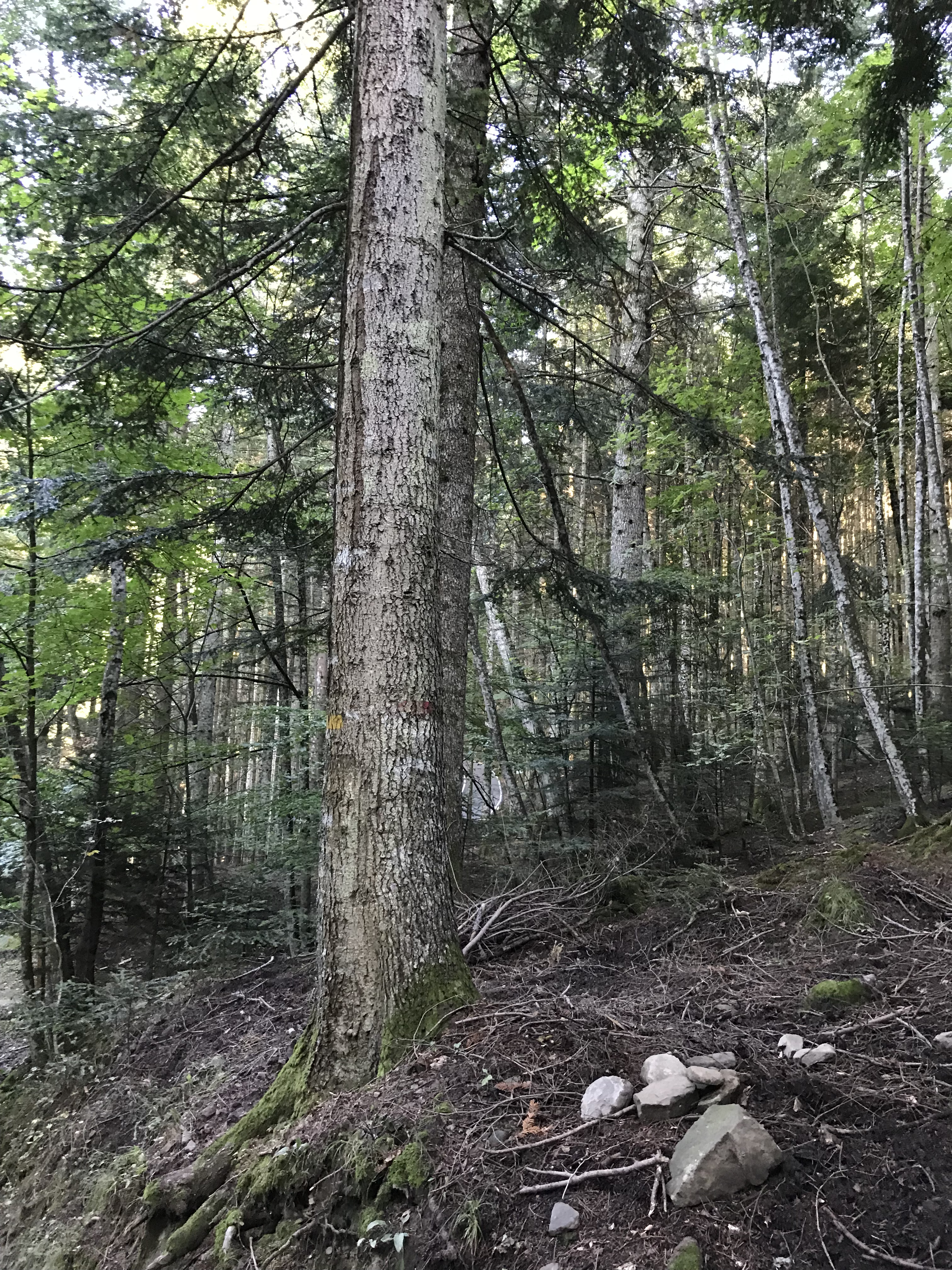
Silver fir trunk and bark of a tree in Vallombrosa State Forest (Italy)

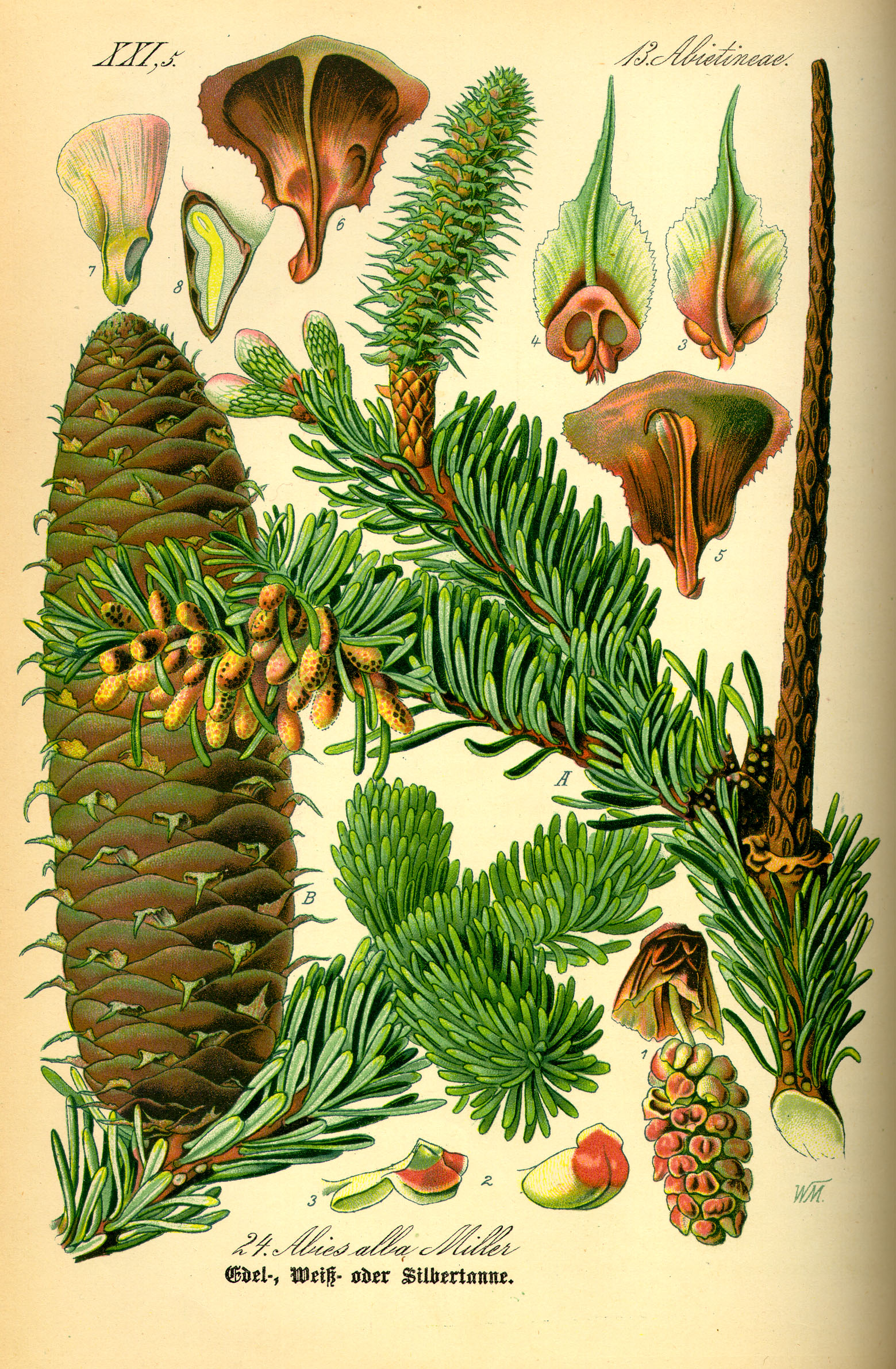
Illustration of several parts of the plant

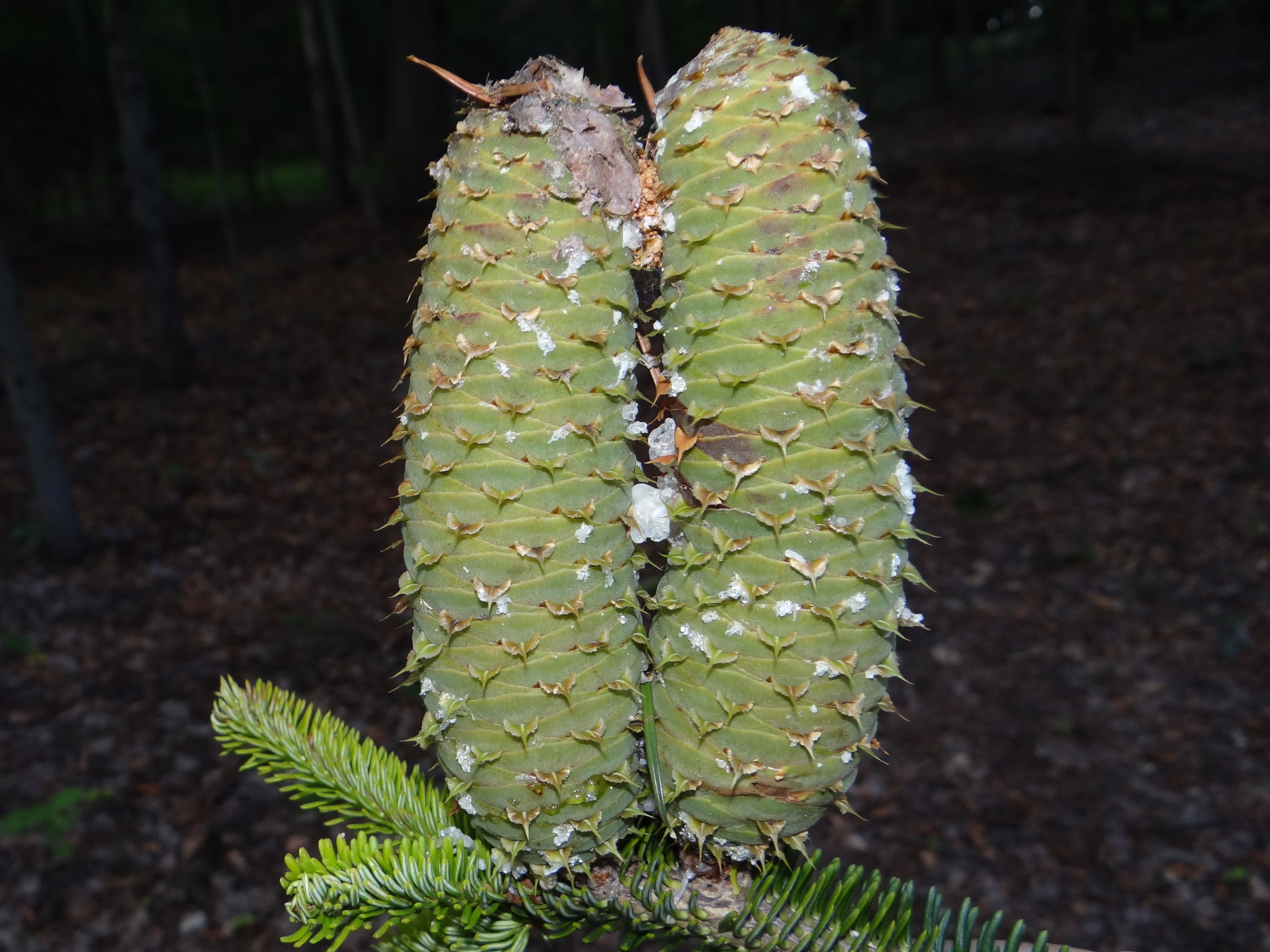
Immature cone

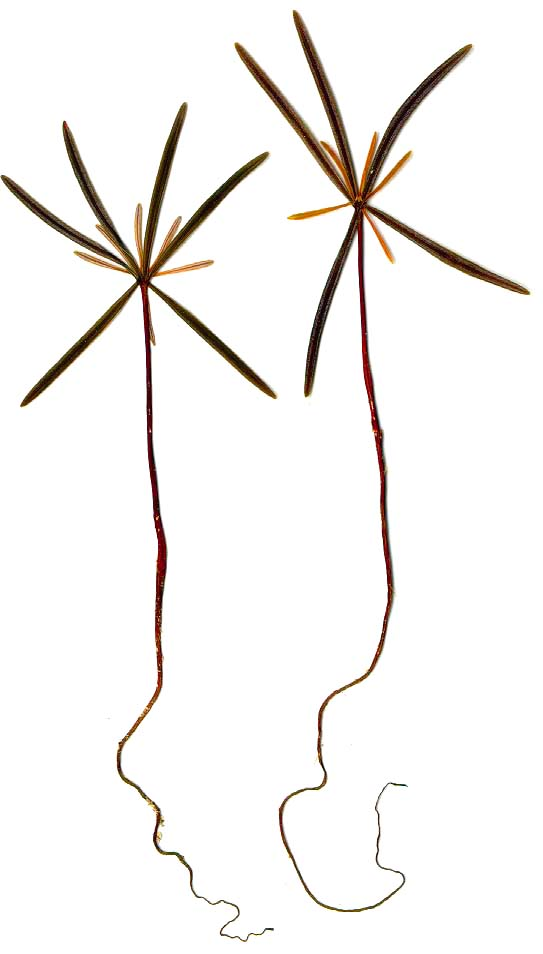
Seedlings

== Description ==
Abies alba is a large evergreen coniferous tree growing to 40–50 m (130–160 ft) tall and with a trunk diameter up to 1.5 m (4 ft 11 in). The largest measured tree was 60 m (200 ft) tall and had a trunk diameter of 3.8 m (12 ft). It occurs at altitudes of 300–1,700 m (980–5,580 ft) (mainly over 500 m (1,600 ft)), on mountains with rainfall over 1,000 millimetres (39 in) per year.

The leaves are needle-like, flattened, 1.8–3.0 cm (0.71–1.18 in) long and 2.0 mm (0.079 in) wide by 0.5 mm (0.020 in) thick, glossy dark green above, and with two greenish-white bands of stomata below. The leaf is usually slightly notched at the tip. The cones are 9–17 cm (3.5–6.7 in) long and 3–4 cm (1.2–1.6 in) broad, with about 150-200 scales, each scale with an exserted bract and two winged seeds; they disintegrate when mature to release the seeds. The wood is white, leading to the species name alba.

In the forest the evergreen tends to form stands with Norway spruce, Scots pine, and European beech. It is closely related to Bulgarian fir (Abies borisii-regis) further to the southeast in the Balkan Peninsula, Spanish fir (Abies pinsapo) of Spain and Morocco and Sicilian fir (Abies nebrodensis) in Sicily, differing from these and other related Euro-Mediterranean firs in the sparser foliage, with the leaves spread either side of the shoot, leaving the shoot readily visible from above. Some botanists treat Bulgarian fir and Sicilian fir as varieties of silver fir, as A. alba var. acutifolia and A. alba var. nebrodensis, respectively.

== Ecology ==
Silver fir is an important component species in the dinaric calcareous block fir forest in the western Balkan Peninsula.

In Italy, the silver fir is an important component of the mixed broadleaved-coniferous forest of the Apennine Mountains, especially in northern Apennine. The fir prefer a cold and humid climate, in northern exposition, with a high rainfall (over 1500 mm per year). In the oriental Alps of Italy, silver firs grow in mixed forests with Norway spruce, beech, and other trees.

Its cone scales are eaten by the caterpillars of the tortrix moth Cydia illutana, while C. duplicana feeds on the bark around injuries or canker.

== Chemistry and pharmacology ==
The bark and wood of silver fir are rich in antioxidative polyphenols. Six phenolic acids were identified (gallic, homovanillic, protocatechuic, p-hydroxybenzoic, vanillic and p-coumaric), three flavonoids (catechin, epicatechin and catechin tetramethyl ether) and eight lignans (taxiresinol, 7-(2-methyl-3,4-dihydroxytetrahydropyran-5-yloxy)-taxiresinol, secoisolariciresinol, lariciresinol, hydroxymatairesinol, isolariciresinol, matairesinol and pinoresinol). The extract from the trunk was shown to prevent atherosclerosis in guinea pigs and to have cardioprotective effect in isolated rat hearts. Silver fir wood extract was found to reduce the post-prandial glycemic response (concentration of sugar in the blood after the meal) in healthy volunteers.

== Cultivation and uses ==
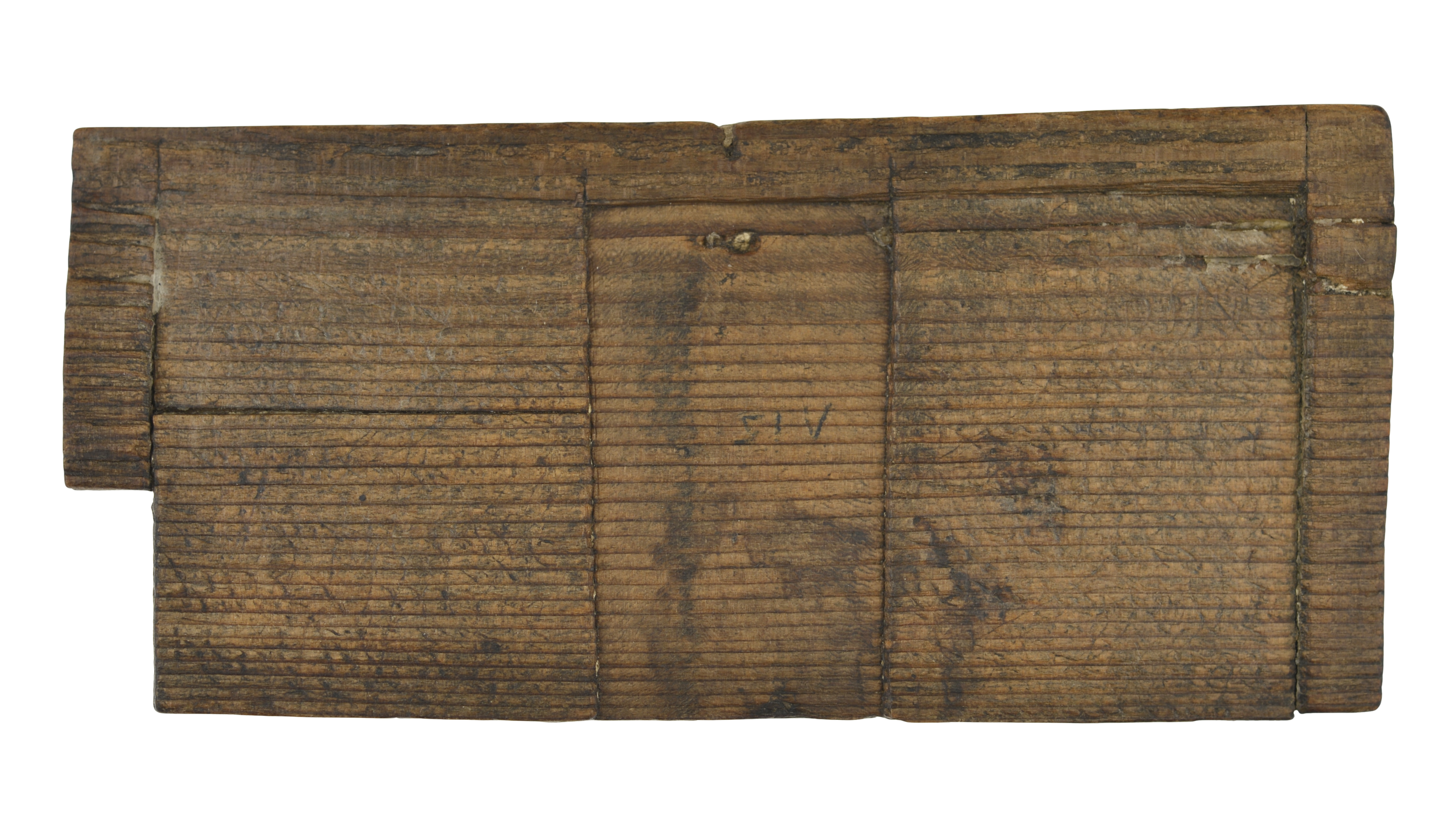
Roman writing tablet from Tongeren, ca. 60-400 AD, made from silver fir.

In Roman times the wood was used to make wooden casks to store and transport wine and other substances. These were often recycled to make writing tablets.

A resinous essential oil can be extracted. This pine-scented oil is used in perfumes, bath products, and aerosol inhalants. Its branches (including the leaves, bark and wood) were used for production of spruce beer.

Silver fir is the species first used as a Christmas tree, but has been largely replaced by Nordmann fir (which has denser, more attractive foliage), Norway spruce (which is much cheaper to grow), and other species. When cultivated on Christmas Tree plantations, the tree naturally forms a symmetrical conical shape. The trees are full and dense with a resinous fragrance, and are known to be one of the longest lasting after being cut. As well as in its native area, it is also grown on Christmas tree plantations in the northeast region of North America spanning New England in the USA to the Maritime Provinces of Canada.

The wood is strong, lightweight, light-coloured, fine grained, even-textured and long fibred. The timber is mainly used as construction wood, furniture, plywood, pulpwood and paper manufacture.

The honeydew which is produced by aphids sitting on the silver fir is collected by honey bees. The resulting honey is marketed as "fir honey".

== Etymology ==
Abies is derived from Latin, meaning 'rising one'. The name was used to refer to tall trees or ships.

Alba means 'bright' or 'dead white'.
