= Enterolignan =

Class of chemical compounds

Enterolignans are organic compounds formed by the action of gut microflora on lignans. They are thus the products of the combined action of both plants and of the animal gut. Prominent enterolignans are enterodiol and enterolactone. Enterolignans are also called "mammalian lignans", although that term is not recommended since mammals do not produce lignans.

Structures of enterodiol and enterlactone

Enterolignans have attracted intense attention because of their potential beneficial roles in nutrition. Elevated levels of enterodiol in urine are attributed consumption of tea and other lignan-rich foods.
