= Enterodiol =

Organic compound

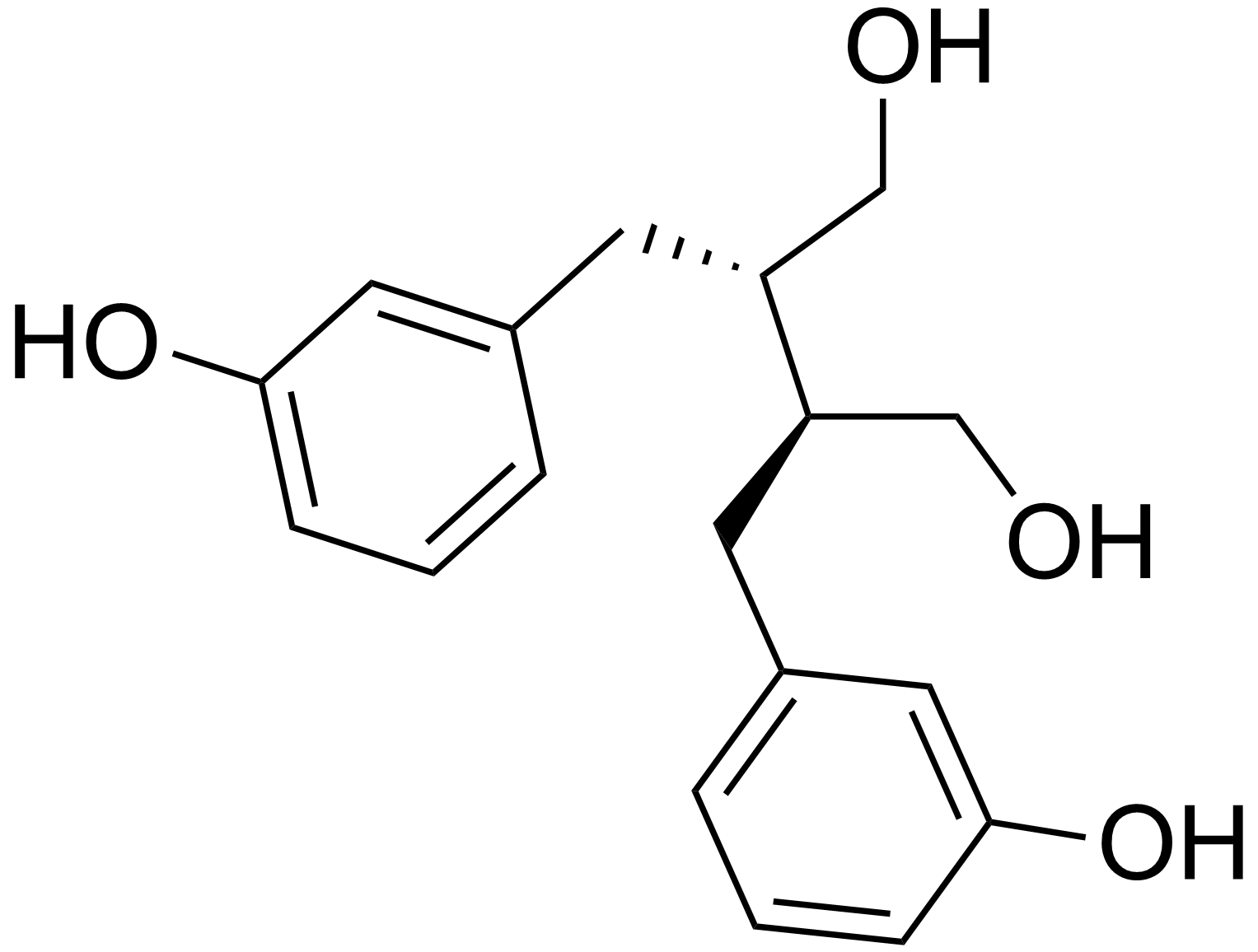

Names
- Preferred IUPAC name (2R,3R)-2,3-Bis[(3-hydroxyphenyl)methyl]butane-1,4-diol
- Other names (−)-Enterodiol

Identifiers
| CAS Number | 80226-00-2 |
| 3D model (JSmol) | Interactive image |
| ChEMBL | ChEMBL471076 |
| ChemSpider | 102992 |
| ECHA InfoCard | 100.162.704 |
| KEGG | C18166 |
| PubChem CID | 115089 |
| UNII | BZF4X2AWRP |
| CompTox Dashboard (EPA) | DTXSID0047876 |
- InChI: InChI=1S/C18H22O4/c19-11-15(7-13-3-1-5-17(21)9-13)16(12-20)8-14-4-2-6-18(22)10-14/h1-6,9-10,15-16,19-22H,7-8,11-12H2/t15-,16-/m0/s1 Key: DWONJCNDULPHLV-HOTGVXAUSA-N; InChI=1/C18H22O4/c19-11-15(7-13-3-1-5-17(21)9-13)16(12-20)8-14-4-2-6-18(22)10-14/h1-6,9-10,15-16,19-22H,7-8,11-12H2/t15-,16-/m0/s1 Key: DWONJCNDULPHLV-HOTGVXAUBO
- SMILES: C1=CC(=CC(=C1)O)C[C@@H](CO)[C@@H](CC2=CC(=CC=C2)O)CO

Properties
| Chemical formula | C_{18}H_{22}O_{4} |
| Molar mass | 302.370 g·mol^{−1} |
| Appearance | colorless |
- Except where otherwise noted, data are given for materials in their standard state (at 25 °C [77 °F], 100 kPa). verify (what is ?) Infobox references

Enterodiol is an organic compound with the formula [HOC_{6}H_{4}CH_{2}CH(CH_{2}OH)]_{2}.

It is formed by the action of intestinal bacteria on lignan precursors. As such it is sometimes classified as a enterolignan or mammalian lignan. Elevated levels of enterodiol in urine are attributed consumption of tea and other lignan-rich foods.
