= Lignan =

Group of polyphenols in plant matter

The lignans are a large group of low molecular weight polyphenols found in plants, particularly seeds, whole grains, and vegetables. The name derives from the Latin word for "wood". Lignans are precursors to phytoestrogens. They may play a role as antifeedants in the defense of seeds and plants against herbivores.

== Biosynthesis and metabolism ==
Structures of some lignans
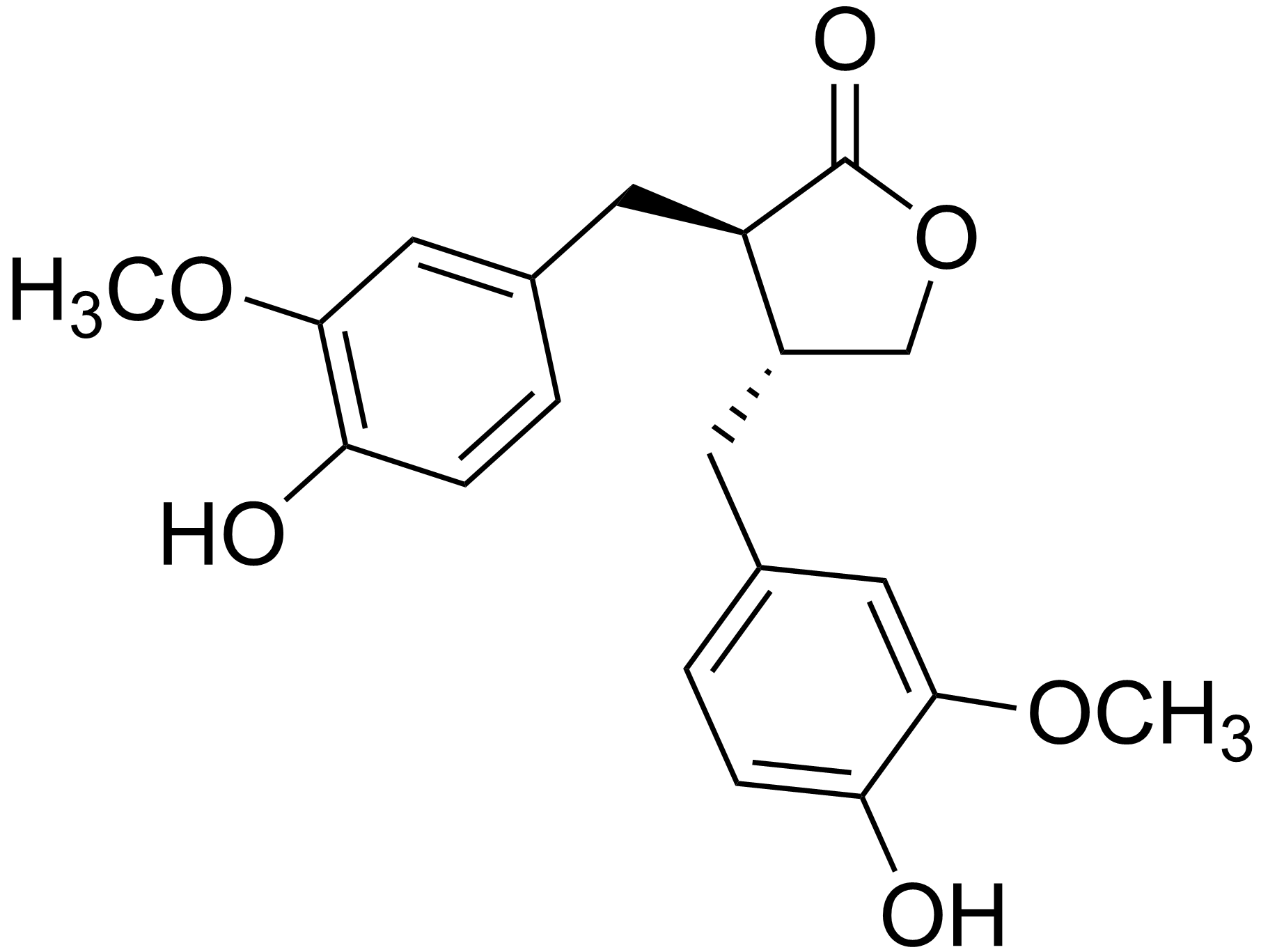
Matairesinol, illustrating the dibenzylbutyrolactone motif

Secoisolariciresinol, illustrating the 9,9'-dihydroxydibenzylbutane motif

Justicidin A, illustrating the arylnaphthalene motif

Pinoresinol, illustrating the furanofuran motif

Steganacin, illustrating the dibenzocyclooctadienelactone motif

Podophyllotoxin, illustrating the aryltetralin motif

Lignans and lignin differ in their molecular weight, the former being small and soluble in water, the latter being high polymers that are undigestable. Both are polyphenolic substances derived by oxidative coupling of monolignols. Thus, most lignans feature a C_{18} cores, resulting from the dimerization of C_{9} precursors. The coupling of the lignols occurs at C8. Eight classes of lignans are: "furofuran, furan, dibenzylbutane, dibenzylbutyrolactone, aryltetralin, arylnaphthalene, dibenzocyclooctadiene, and dibenzylbutyrolactol."

Many lignans are metabolized by mammalian gut microflora, producing so-called enterolignans.

== Food sources ==
Flax seeds and sesame seeds contain high levels of lignans. The principal lignan precursor found in flaxseeds is secoisolariciresinol diglucoside. Other foods containing lignans include cereals (rye, wheat, oat and barley), soybeans, tofu, cruciferous vegetables (such as broccoli and cabbage), and some fruits (particularly apricots and strawberries). Lignans are not present in seed oil, and their contents in whole or ground seeds may vary according to geographic location, climate, and maturity of the seed crop, and the duration of seed storage.

Secoisolariciresinol and matairesinol were the first plant lignans identified in foods. Typically, lariciresinol and pinoresinol contribute about 75% to the total lignan intake, whereas secoisolariciresinol and matairesinol contribute only about 25%.

Foods containing lignans:

Source	Lignan amount
Flaxseeds	85.5 mg per oz (28.35 g)
Sesame seeds	11.2 mg per oz
Brassica vegetables	0.3-0.8 mg per half cup (125 ml)
Strawberries	0.2 mg per half cup

== Prevalence and health effects ==
Lignans are the principal source of dietary phytoestrogens in typical Western diets, even though most research on phytoestrogen-rich diets has focused on soy isoflavones. Lignan's enterolignan products enterodiol and enterolactone have weak estrogenic activity, but they may also exert biological effects through non-estrogenic means.

A 2021 review found that lignans have a positive effect on lipid profiles of patients with dyslipidemia related diseases. As of 2022, there is limited evidence that dietary intake of lignans is associated with a reduced cancer and cardiovascular disease risk.

== See also ==
- Herbalism
- Pharmacognosy
- Flavonolignan
