= Matairesinol =

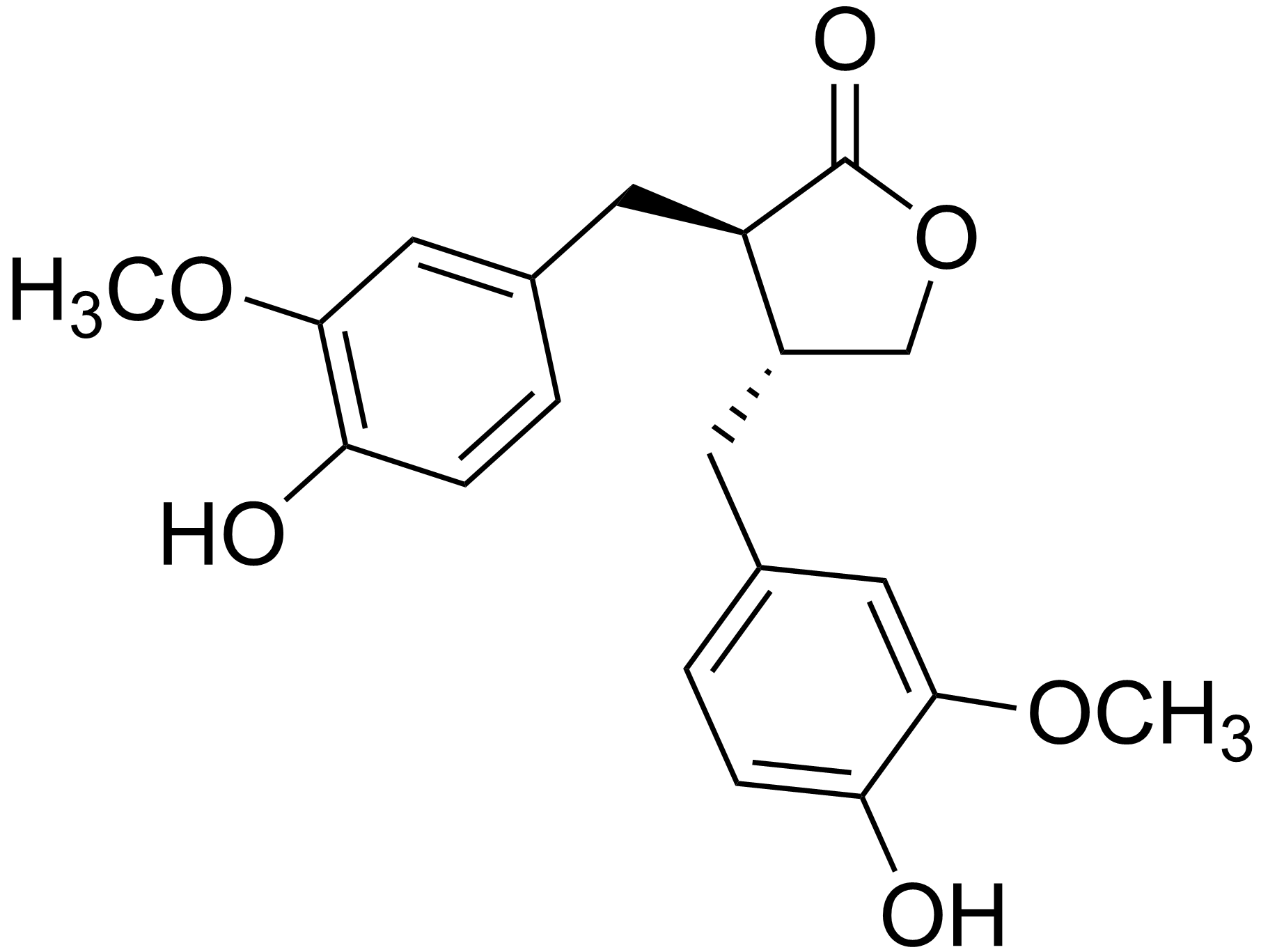
- Chemical structure of matairesinol

Names
- IUPAC name (8β,8′α)-4,4′-Dihydroxy-3,3′-dimethoxylignano-9,9′-lactone
- Systematic IUPAC name (3R,4R)-3,4-Bis[(4-hydroxy-3-methoxyphenyl)methyl]oxolan-2-one
- Other names (αR,βR)-α,β-Bis(4-hydroxy-3-methoxybenzyl)butyrolactone

Identifiers
CAS Number	580-72-3
3D model (JSmol)	Interactive image
ChEBI	CHEBI:6698
ChEMBL	ChEMBL425148
ChemSpider	106491
DrugBank	DB04200
KEGG	C10682
PubChem CID	119205
UNII	XLW63P8WUA
CompTox Dashboard (EPA)	DTXSID40920490
- InChI: InChI=1S/C20H22O6/c1-24-18-9-12(3-5-16(18)21)7-14-11-26-20(23)15(14)8-13-4-6-17(22)19(10-13)25-2/h3-6,9-10,14-15,21-22H,7-8,11H2,1-2H3/t14-,15+/m0/s1 Key: MATGKVZWFZHCLI-LSDHHAIUSA-N; InChI=1S/C20H22O6/c1-24-18-9-12(3-5-16(18)21)7-14-11-26-20(23)15(14)8-13-4-6-17(22)19(10-13)25-2/h3-6,9-10,14-15,21-22H,7-8,11H2,1-2H3/t14-,15+/m0/s1 Key: MATGKVZWFZHCLI-LSDHHAIUBP; Key: MATGKVZWFZHCLI-LSDHHAIUSA-N
- SMILES: O=C2OC[C@H](Cc1cc(OC)c(O)cc1)[C@H]2Cc3ccc(O)c(OC)c3

Properties
Chemical formula	C_{20}H_{22}O_{6}
Molar mass	358.390 g·mol^{−1}
- Except where otherwise noted, data are given for materials in their standard state (at 25 °C [77 °F], 100 kPa). verify (what is ?) Infobox references

Matairesinol is an organic compound. It is classified as a lignan, i.e., a type of phenylpropanoid. It is present in some cereals, such as rye, and together with secoisolariciresinol has attracted much attention for its beneficial nutritional effects.

== Metabolism ==
The plant lignans are precursors of the enterolignans (mammalian lignans).

== Biomedical considerations ==
Although some studies attribute disease preventative (cardio-protective and hormone associated cancers like breast cancer) benefits of lignans, the results are inconclusive. Matairesinol has been found to act as an agonist of the adiponectin receptor 1 (AdipoR1).
