= Condyloma =

Condyloma (plural: "Condylomata", from Greek “kondylōma” "knuckle") refers two types of infection of the genitals:

- Condyloma acuminata, or genital warts, caused by human papilloma virus subtypes 6, 11, and others
- Condylomata lata, white lesions associated with secondary syphilis

== See also ==
- Sexually transmitted disease
