= Remediation of per- and polyfluoroalkyl substances =

Remediation of per- and polyfluoroalkyl substances refers to the destruction or removal of per- and polyfluoroalkyl substances (PFASs) from the environment. PFASs are a group of synthetic organofluorine compounds, used in diverse products such as non-stick cookware and firefighting foams, that have attracted great concern as persistent organic pollutants. Because they are pervasive and have adverse effects, much interest has focused on their removal.

PFASs are by design highly stable. They often occur as extremely dilute (ppm to ppb) solutions. These factors – resilience and diluteness – make remediation extremely challenging. Nonetheless, diverse methods are being tested including sonolysis, electrochemical oxidation, advanced oxidation processes, as well as the use of oxidative enzymes (such as peroxidase and laccase). All of these methods promote the formation of hydroxyl radicals or other oxidizing agents that can oxidize PFAS and break its C−C bonds. However, the remediation of PFAS depends on the environmental medium where these compounds reside. For example, the treatment of contaminated soil, biosolids and water is not the same, and risk-based approach may be recommended for the remediation.

== Destruction ==
Both oxidative and reductive approaches can be taken to destroy PFASs. The oxidation of perfluorooctane sulfonic acid (PFOS), as one prominent example, is described as follows:

C_{8}F_{17}SO_{3}H + 8 H_{2}O + 4 O_{2} → 17 HF + 8 CO_{2} + SO_{3}

The challenge implicit in this approach is that PFASs have been used in aqueous film forming foam (AFFF) because they both make foams and they resist oxidation.

For the perfluorocarboxylic acids, such as perfluorooctanoic acid (PFOA), decarboxylation has been identified as a possible route to their eventual degradation.

C_{8}F_{17}CO^{−}_{2} → C_{6}F_{13}CF=CF_{2} + F^{−} + CO_{2}

No remediation technology is applicable to real-world concentrations and media.

== Adsorption ==
Through the process of adsorption, PFASs can in principle be concentrated to facilitate their physical removal from the environment.

Adsorption is generally more efficient in an acidic environment and with mesopores. Carbons such as activated carbon and biochar have a very high specific surface area and are nonpolar, allowing them to interact with the hydrophobic tail of PFAS molecules. They can also be regenerated through different methods like heat treatment, microwave assisted regeneration and with different solvents. Anion exchange resins, metal–organic frameworks, and layered double hydroxides may also be used for the adsorption of PFAS (PFAS can become an anion through losing a hydrogen from its head). In situ, adsorption is less effective due to the presence of other pollutants in the water. Hence, this area provides more opportunities for potential research.

=== Hybrid methodologies ===
Several "hybrid" methodologies have been described for the treatment of PFAS, such as nanofiltration combined with electrochemical oxidation, biochar with zero valent ion, GAC adsorption and thermal mineralization.

Of several biological hybrid methods thermophilic anaerobic digestion can be combined by adsorption by activated carbon to remove up to 61% of PFAS from sewage sludge.

=== Regeneration ===
Activated carbon granules or particles can undergo thermal regeneration and reuse the surface while breaking down PFAS at the same time. However, various harmful products can be produced as a result, such as tetrafluoromethane, a strong greenhouse gas, and the heating process is expensive. Meanwhile, regeneration with a solvent does not break down PFAS, so further waste treatment is required.

=== Reverse osmosis ===
Reverse osmosis and nanofiltration effectively separate PFAS but are typically too expensive to be viable solutions.
