= C27H34O11 =

The molecular formula C_{27}H_{34}O_{11} (molar mass: 534.55 g/mol, exact mass: 534.2101 u) may refer to:

- Arctiin, a lignan
- Phillyrin, a lignan
