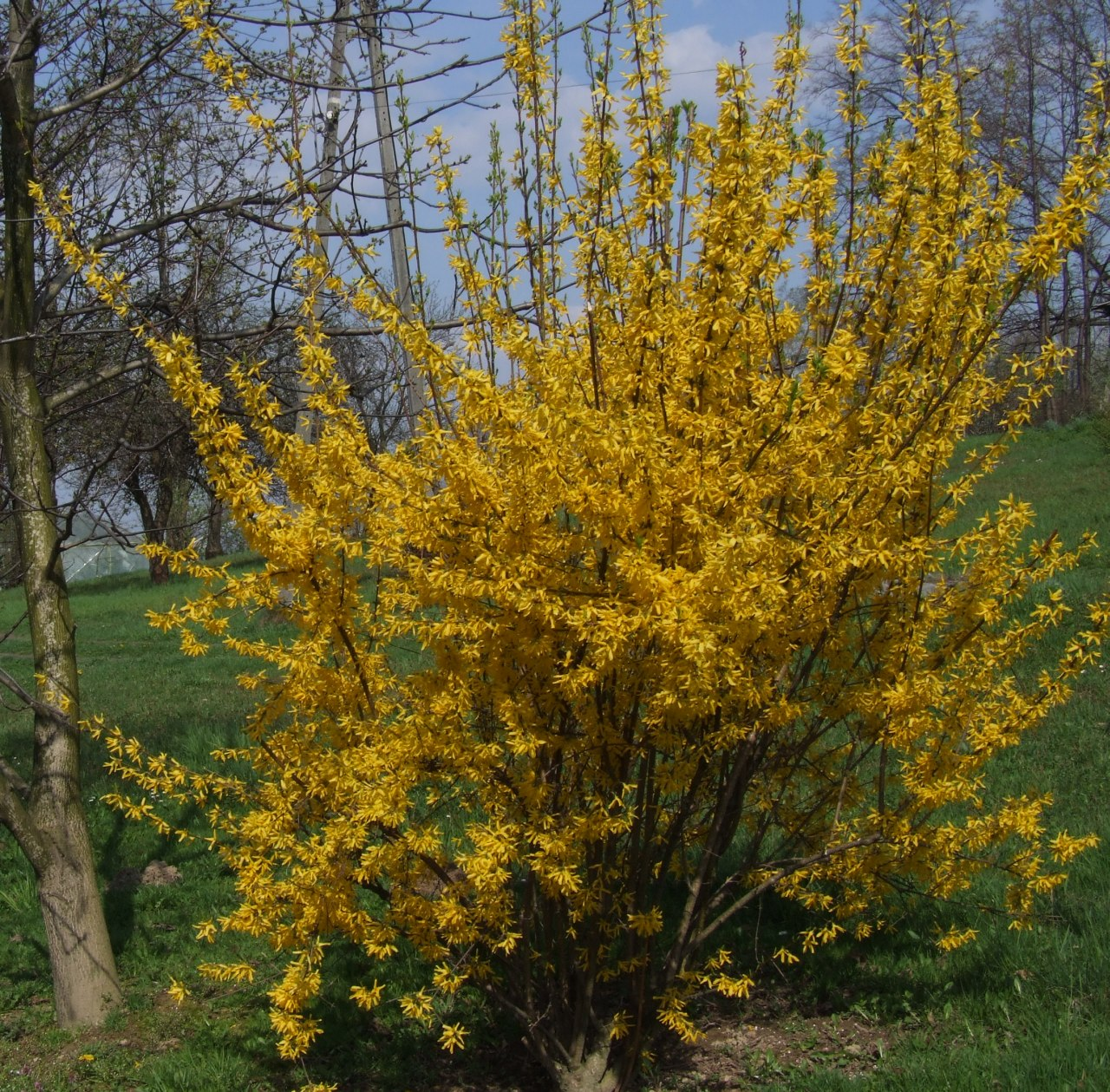

Scientific classification
- Kingdom: Plantae
- Clade: Tracheophytes
- Clade: Angiosperms
- Clade: Eudicots
- Clade: Asterids
- Order: Lamiales
- Family: Oleaceae
- Genus: Forsythia
- Species: F. × intermedia

Binomial name
- Forsythia × intermedia Zabel

= Forsythia × intermedia =

Hybrid flowering plant in the olive family

Forsythia × intermedia, or border forsythia, is an ornamental deciduous shrub of garden origin.

== Description ==
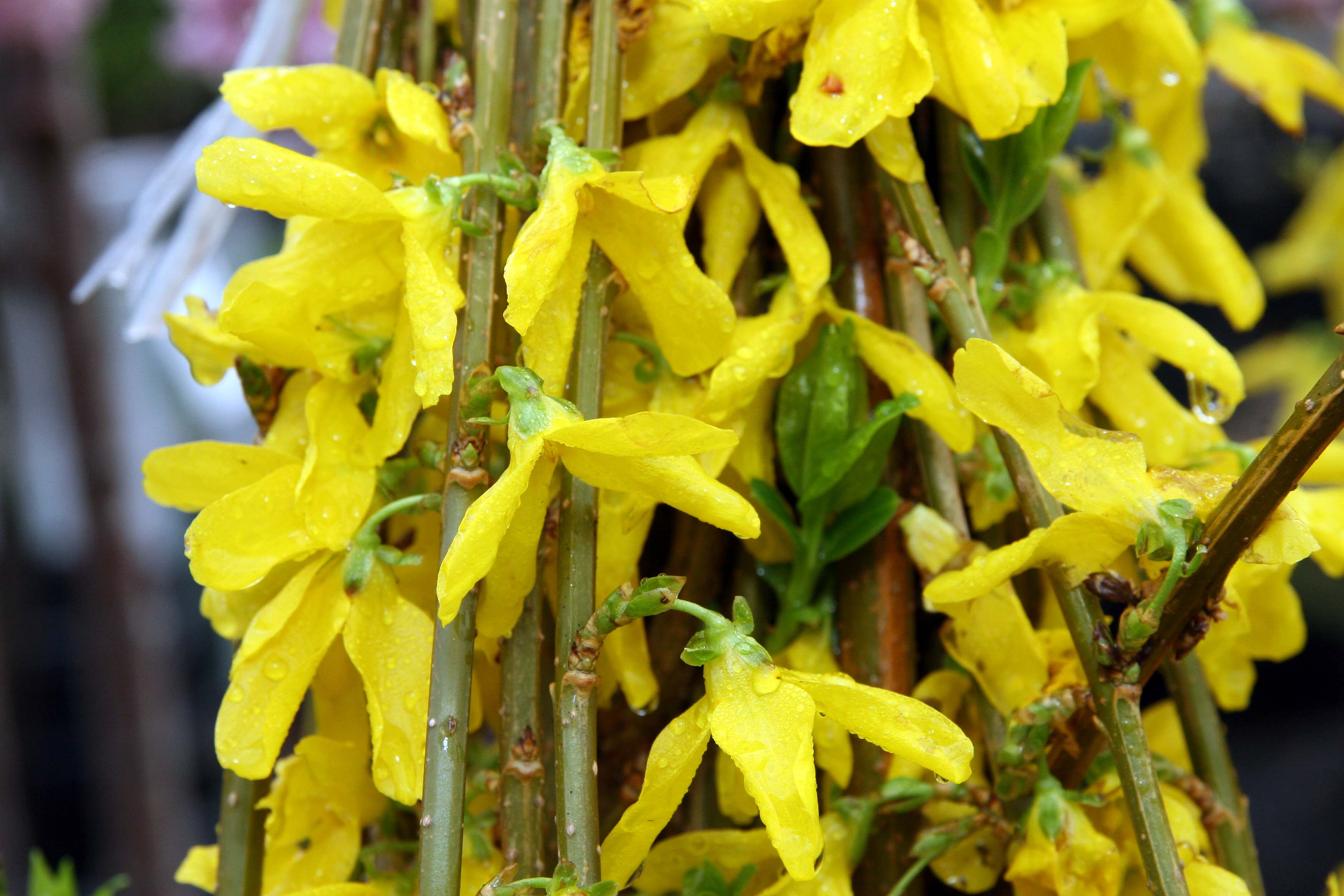

The shrub has an upright habit with arching branches and grows to 3 to 4 metres high. The opposite leaves turn yellowish or occasionally purplish in the autumn before falling. The bright yellow flowers are produced on one- to two-year-old growth and may be solitary or in racemes from 2 to 6.

== Origin ==
The hybrid is thought to be a cross between Forsythia viridissima and F. suspensa var. fortunei. A plant of seedling origin was discovered growing in the Göttingen Botanical Garden in Germany by the director of the Royal Prussian Academy of Forestry in Münden, H. Zabel in 1878. Zabel formally described and named the hybrid in Gartenflora in 1885. It was introduced to the Arnold Arboretum in the United States in 1889.

== Cultivation ==
The hybrid is best suited to a position in full sun or partial shade and is drought-tolerant. Like some other forsythias it is one of the earliest shrubs to flower. Well adapted to temperature changes, it blooms with bright yellow flowers that are noticeable even in twilight. It is one of several forsythia species that are widely cultivated in gardens and parks.

=== Cultivars ===
Cultivars include (those marked agm have gained the Royal Horticultural Society's Award of Garden Merit):

- 'Arnold Dwarf' – low-growing with pale yellow flowers
- 'Beatrix Farrand' – a particularly floriferous cultivar
- 'Gold Tide' ('Courtasol') – floriferous, with deep yellow autumn colour
- 'Karl Sax' – deep yellow flowers with orange lines in the throat. Introduced by the Arnold Arboretum in 1960.
- 'Lynwood' – large flowers with broad petals
- 'Lynwood Variety'agm
- 'Spectabilis'
- 'Spring Glory' – purple-tinged foliage in autumn
- 'Variegata' – leaves with contrasting cream edges
- Week End='Courtalyn'agm

== Chemistry ==
The first dirigent protein was discovered in Forsythia intermedia. This protein has been found to direct the stereoselective biosynthesis of (+)-pinoresinol from coniferyl alcohol monomers.
