= Aeromonas infection =

Bacterial disease

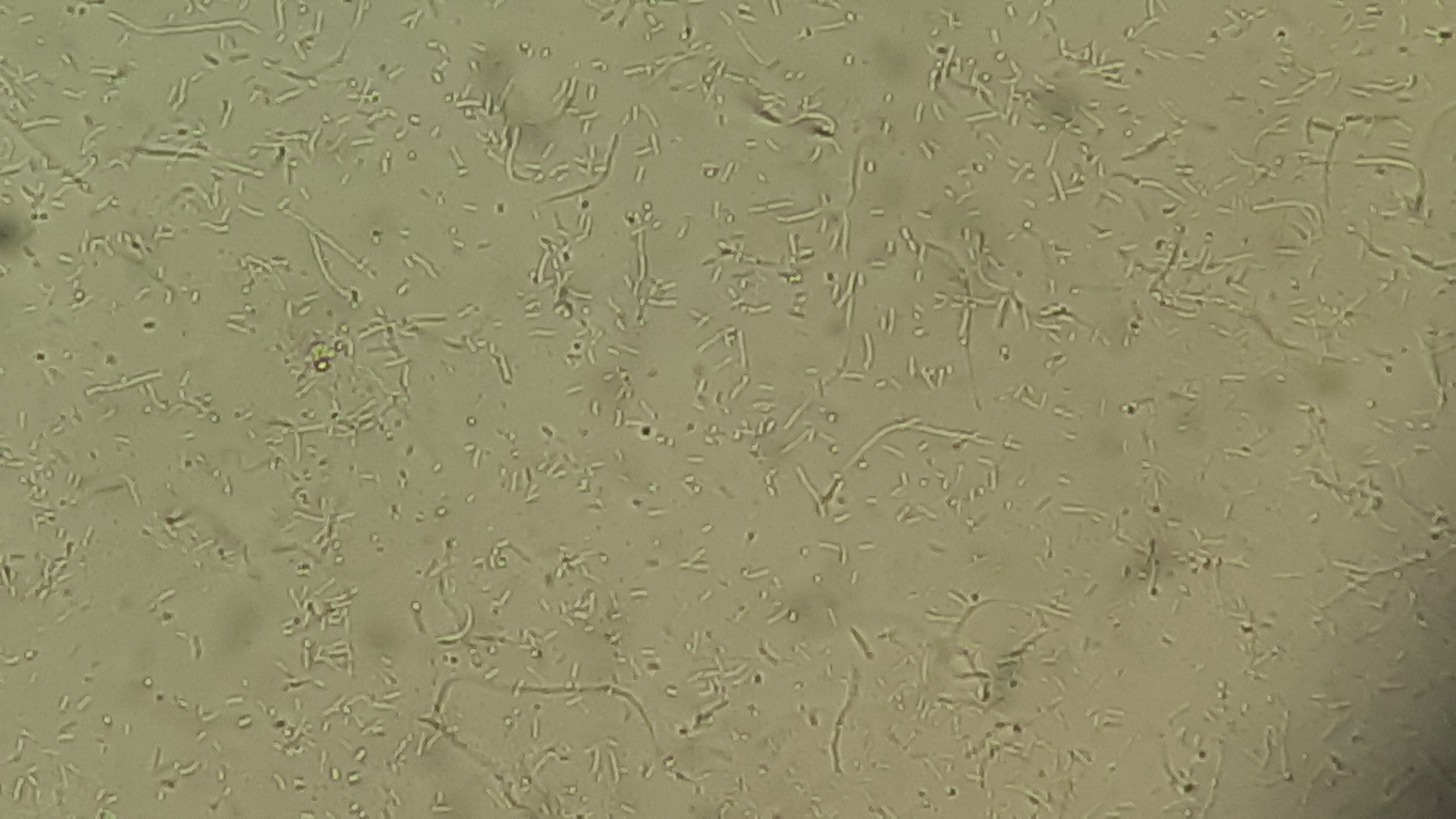
- Aeromonas hydrophila in wet mount of culture microscopy at magnification of 1600X.
- Specialty: Infectious diseases

Aeromonas infections include skin infections such as cellulitis, pustules, and furuncles. Aeromonas species can also cause gastroenteritis.

Aeromonas infections can sometimes be spread by leech bites.

== See also ==
- Aeromonas
- Chromobacteriosis infection
- Skin lesion
