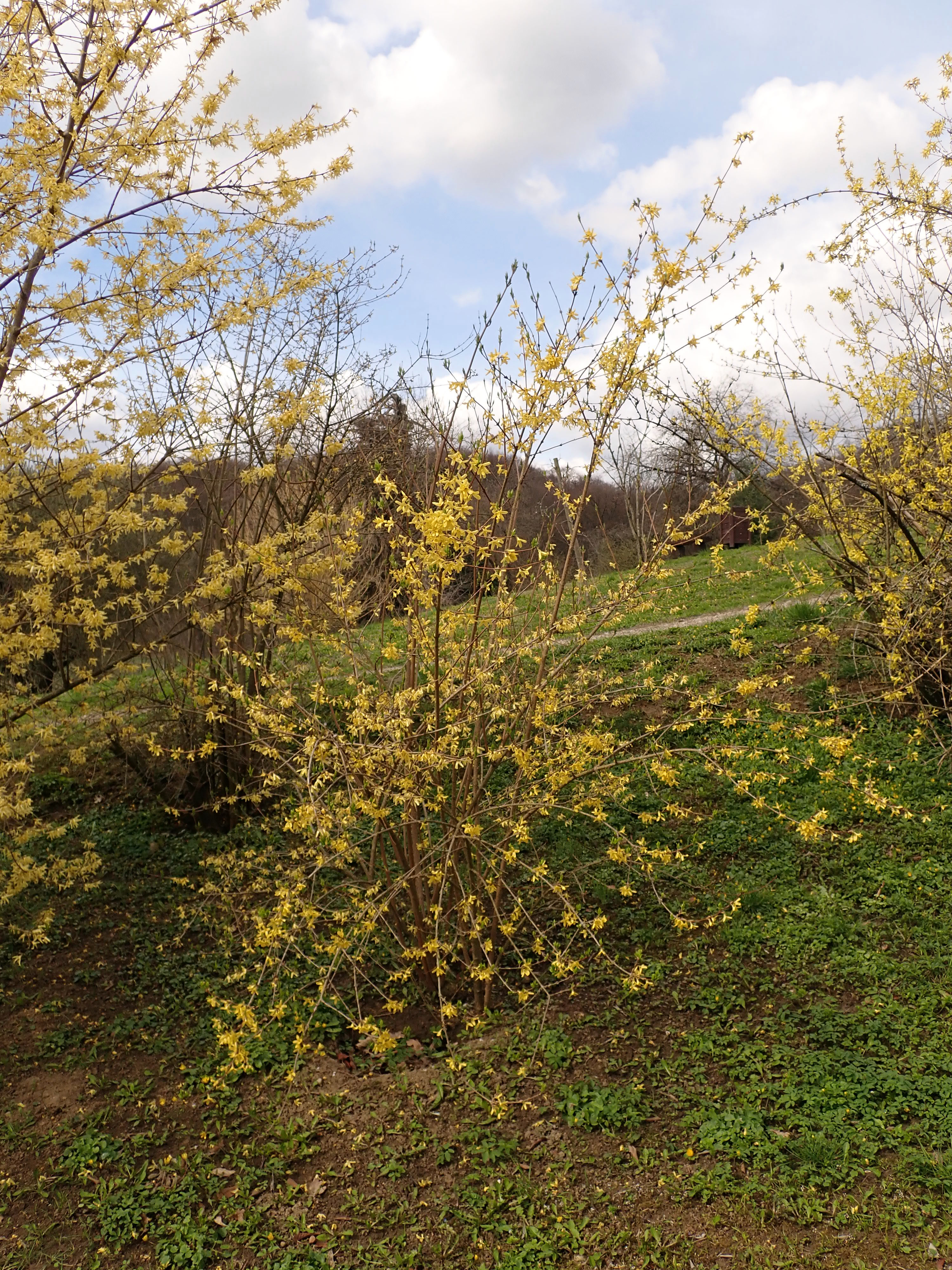
- Habit
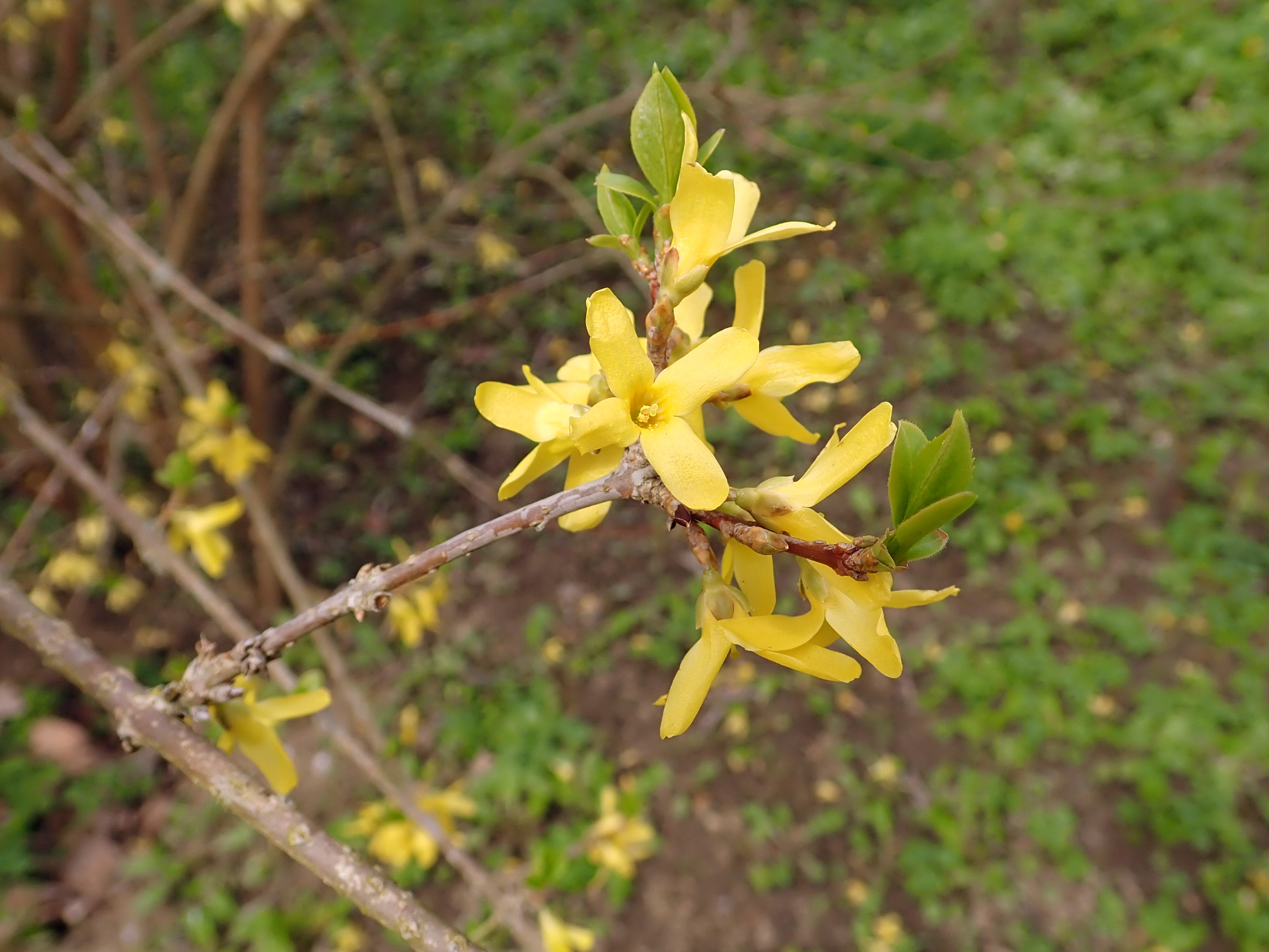
- Flowers and budding leaves

Conservation status
- Endangered (IUCN 3.1)

Scientific classification
- Kingdom: Plantae
- Clade: Embryophytes
- Clade: Tracheophytes
- Clade: Spermatophytes
- Clade: Angiosperms
- Clade: Eudicots
- Clade: Asterids
- Order: Lamiales
- Family: Oleaceae
- Genus: Forsythia
- Species: F. ovata

Binomial name
- Forsythia ovata Nakai

Synonyms
- Forsythia saxatilis (Nakai) Nakai; Forsythia saxatilis var. lanceolata S.Lee; Forsythia saxatilis var. pilosa S.Lee; Rangium ovatum (Nakai) Ohwi

= Forsythia ovata =

Species of flowering plant

Forsythia ovata (Korean: 만리화 man li hwa), the Korean forsythia or early forsythia, is a species of flowering plant in the family Oleaceae, native to the Korean Peninsula. An early bloomer, it is deer resistant, and hardy to −50 °F (−46 °C); USDA Hardiness zone 2a.
