= Dirigent protein =

Dirigent proteins are members of a class of proteins which dictate the stereochemistry of a compound synthesized by other enzymes. The first dirigent protein was discovered in Forsythia intermedia. This protein has been found to direct the stereoselective biosynthesis of (+)-pinoresinol from coniferyl alcohol monomers:

Lignan biosynthesis is catalysed by oxidative enzymes. In the test tube the reaction results in a heterogeneous mixture of dimeric compounds. When a dirigent protein is present during the reaction, one stereoisomer of one compound is highly enriched. Dirigent proteins appear to possess no oxidative radical forming activity of their own; in the absence of oxidative enzyme, no reaction will occur.

Recently, a second, enantiocomplementary dirigent protein was identified in Arabidopsis thaliana, which directs enantioselective synthesis of (-)-pinoresinol.

== Activity ==
In lignan biosynthesis, oxidative enzymes perform proton-coupled electron transfer to remove a hydrogen atom from monolignols, forming a radical intermediate. These intermediates then couple in a radical termination reaction to form one of a variety of dimers, known as lignans. In vitro reactions of coniferyl alcohol (a common monolignol) in the presence of oxidative enzymes produce a wide variety of different dimers at varying concentrations. When dirigent protein from "Forsythia intermedia" is present, production of (+)-pinoresinol is greatly enriched, and other products are far less abundant. Because this enrichment is so pronounced, the enzyme is hypothesized to produce (+)-pinoresinol exclusively, and to compete with the non-protein-mediated coupling reaction, which produces a heterologous mix of products. This has been confirmed by analyzing the various mixtures produced with different concentrations of dirigent proteins present. The mechanism by which this stereoselectivity is achieved is not well understood at this time. However, since no reaction proceeds in the absence of oxidative enzymes, dirigent protein does not itself appear to catalyze the oxidation of coniferyl alcohol to form radicals.

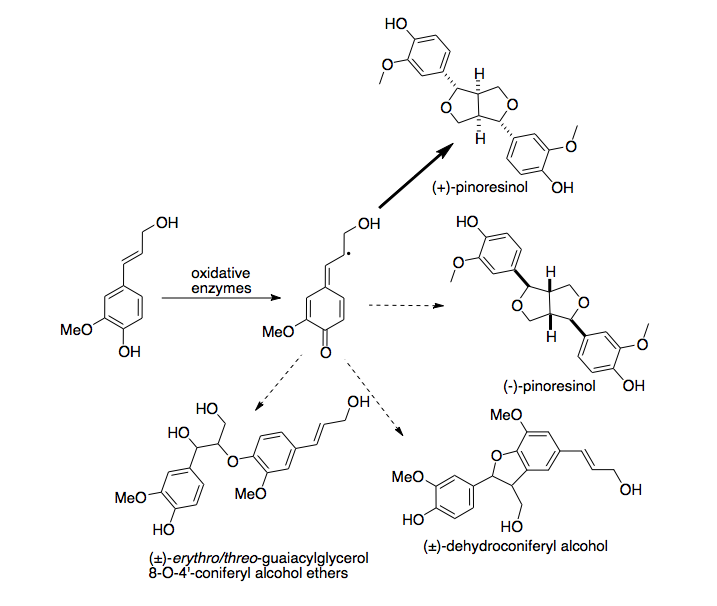
In the presence of dirigent protein from Forsythia intermedia, production of (+)-pinoresinol is greatly enriched while production of other products of dimerization is inhibited.

The activity of dirigent protein from Forsythia intermedia is specific to coniferyl alcohol. When other monolignols, such as p-coumaryl alcohol and sinapyl alcohol, are reacted in vitro with oxidative enzymes in the presence of dirigent protein, they produce a heterologous mixture of products indistinguishable from identical experiments in the absence of dirigent protein.

== Structure ==
Circular dichroism experiments have shown that the secondary structure of dirigent protein from Forsythia intermedia is composed primarily of β-pleated sheets and loop structures. The tertiary structure has not been solved, but the protein has been confirmed to be dimeric. Each dimer has a single binding site for coniferyl alcohol, for a total of two binding sites. One coniferyl alcohol can bind to each site, so that the reaction geometry between the two is confined, increasing the production of (+)-pinoresinol and inhibiting the production of other products.

== Biological importance ==
In the absence of dirigent protein, pinoresinol is a relatively minor product of lignas biosynthesis. When dirigent protein is present, it becomes the major product. The biological significance of (+)-pinoresinol in plants is not fully understood, but it has been found to be effective as a feeding deterrent against ants in caterpillars of the cabbage butterfly, which obtain the compound from their diet. It may serve a similar defensive purpose in Forsythia intermedia.
