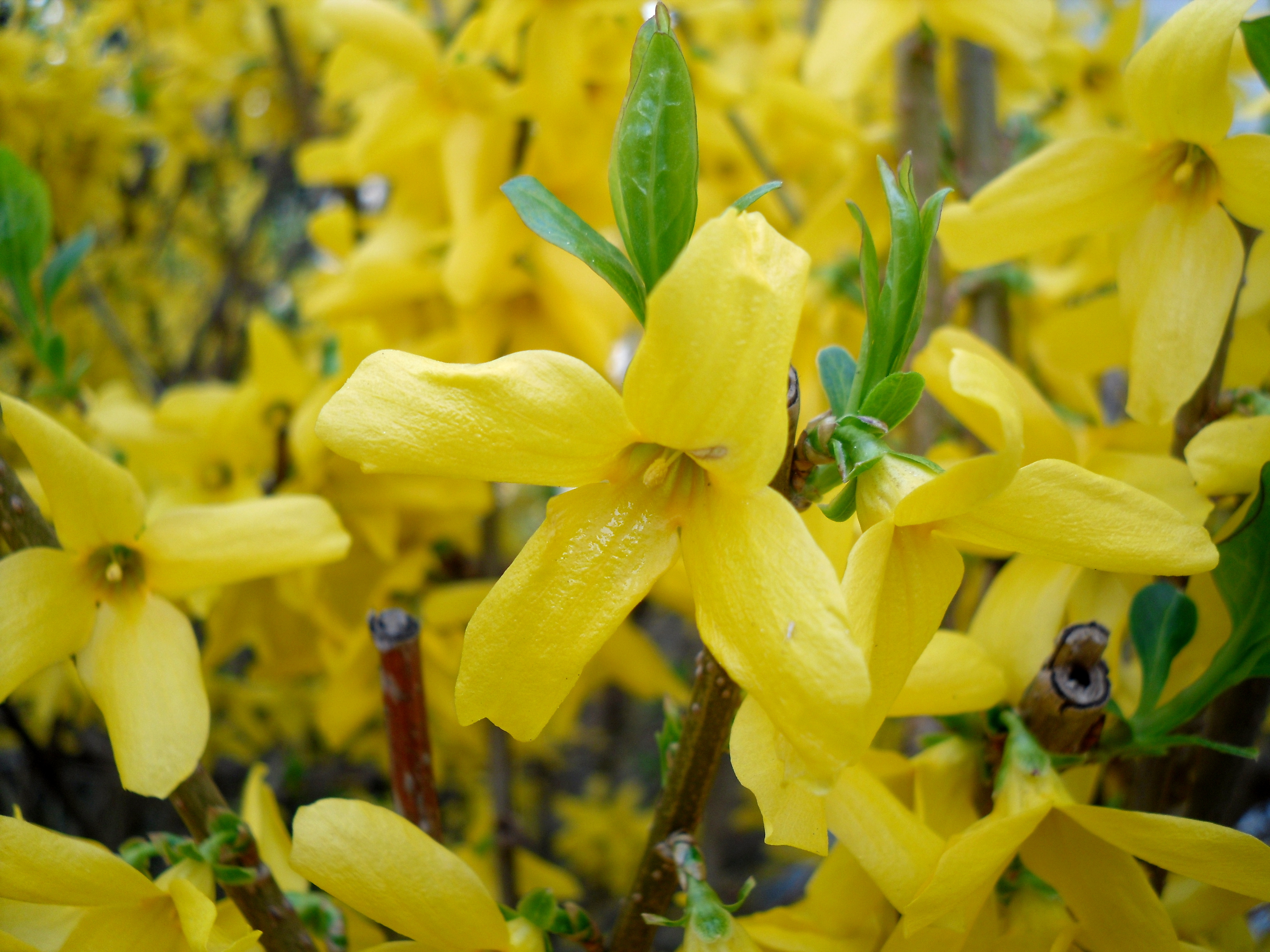
- Forsythia × intermedia

Scientific classification
- Kingdom: Plantae
- Clade: Tracheophytes
- Clade: Angiosperms
- Clade: Eudicots
- Clade: Asterids
- Order: Lamiales
- Family: Oleaceae
- Tribe: Forsythieae
- Genus: Forsythia; Vahl

Type species
- Forsythia suspensa (Thunb.) Vahl

Synonyms
- Rangium Juss. in G.-F.Cuvier

= Forsythia =

Genus of flowering plants in the olive family

Forsythia
- Traditional Chinese: 連翹
- Simplified Chinese: 连翘
Transcriptions
Standard Mandarin
- Hanyu Pinyin: liánqiáo
- IPA: [ljɛ̌n.tɕʰjǎʊ]
Yue: Cantonese
- Yale Romanization: lìhn-kìuh
- Jyutping: lin^{4}-kiu^{4}
- IPA: [lin˩.kʰiw˩]

Forsythia /fɔːrˈsɪθiə/, /fɔːrˈsaɪθiə/ is a genus of flowering plants in the olive family Oleaceae. There are about 11 species, mostly native to Eastern Asia, but one native to Southeastern Europe. Forsythia – also one of the plant's common names – is named after the botanist William Forsyth.

== Description ==
Forsythia are deciduous shrubs typically growing to a height of 1–3 m (3 ft 3 in – 9 ft 10 in) and, rarely, up to 6 m (20 ft) with rough grey-brown bark. The leaves are borne oppositely and are usually simple, though sometimes trifoliate with a basal pair of small leaflets; they range between 2 and 10 cm (0.79 and 3.94 in) in length and, rarely, up to 15 cm (5.9 in), with a margin that is serrated or entire (smooth). Twigs may be hollow or chambered, depending on the species.

The flowers are produced in the early spring before the leaves, bright yellow with a deeply four-lobed corolla, the petals joined only at the base. These become pendent in rainy weather thus shielding the reproductive parts. The fruit is a dry capsule, containing several winged seeds.

There is a long-standing belief that forsythia flowers produce lactose, but lactose occurs only very rarely in natural sources other than milk, and attempts to find lactose in forsythia have been unsuccessful.

The genus is named after William Forsyth (1737–1804), a Scottish botanist who was a royal head gardener and a founding member of the Royal Horticultural Society.

== Species ==
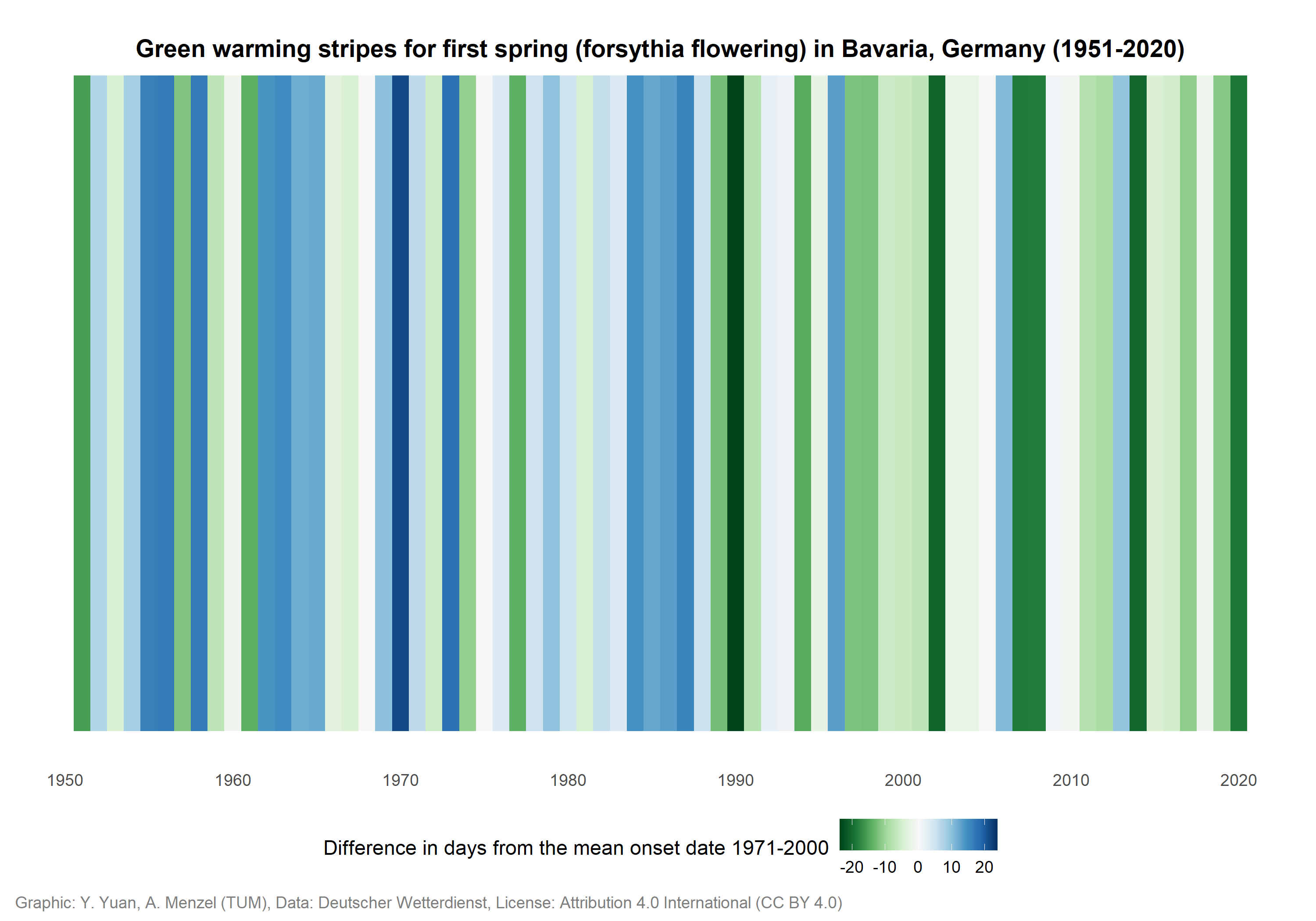
An adaptation of the warming stripes that shows how the flowering time of Forsythia suspensa in Bavaria has changed between 1951 and 2020

The following species of Forsythia have been documented:

- Forsythia europaea Degen & Bald. – Balkans in Albania and Serbia
- Forsythia giraldiana Lingelsh. – northwest China
- Forsythia × intermedia Zabel – an artificial garden hybrid between F. suspensa and F. viridissima
- Forsythia japonica Makino – Japan
- Forsythia koreana (Rehder) Nakai – Korea
- Forsythia likiangensis Ching & K.M.Feng – southwest China
- Forsythia × mandschurica Uyeki – northeast China
- Forsythia mira M.C.Chang – north central China
- Forsythia ovata Nakai – Korea
- Forsythia saxatilis (Nakai) Nakai – Korea
- Forsythia suspensa (Thunb.) Vahl – eastern and central China
- Forsythia togashii H.Hara – Japan (Shōdoshima)
- Forsythia velutina Nakai – Korea
- Forsythia viridissima Lindl. – eastern China

A genetic study does not fully match the traditionally accepted species listed above, and groups the species in four clades: (1) F. suspensa; (2) F. europaea—F. giraldiana; (3) F. ovata—F. japonica—F. viridissima; and (4) F. koreana—F. mandschurica—F. saxatilis. Of the additional species, F. koreana is usually cited as a variety of F. viridissima, and F. saxatilis as a variety of F. japonica; the genetic evidence suggests they may be better treated as distinct species.

Forsythias are used as food plants by the larvae of some Lepidoptera species including the brown-tail and Gothic moth.

== Garden history ==
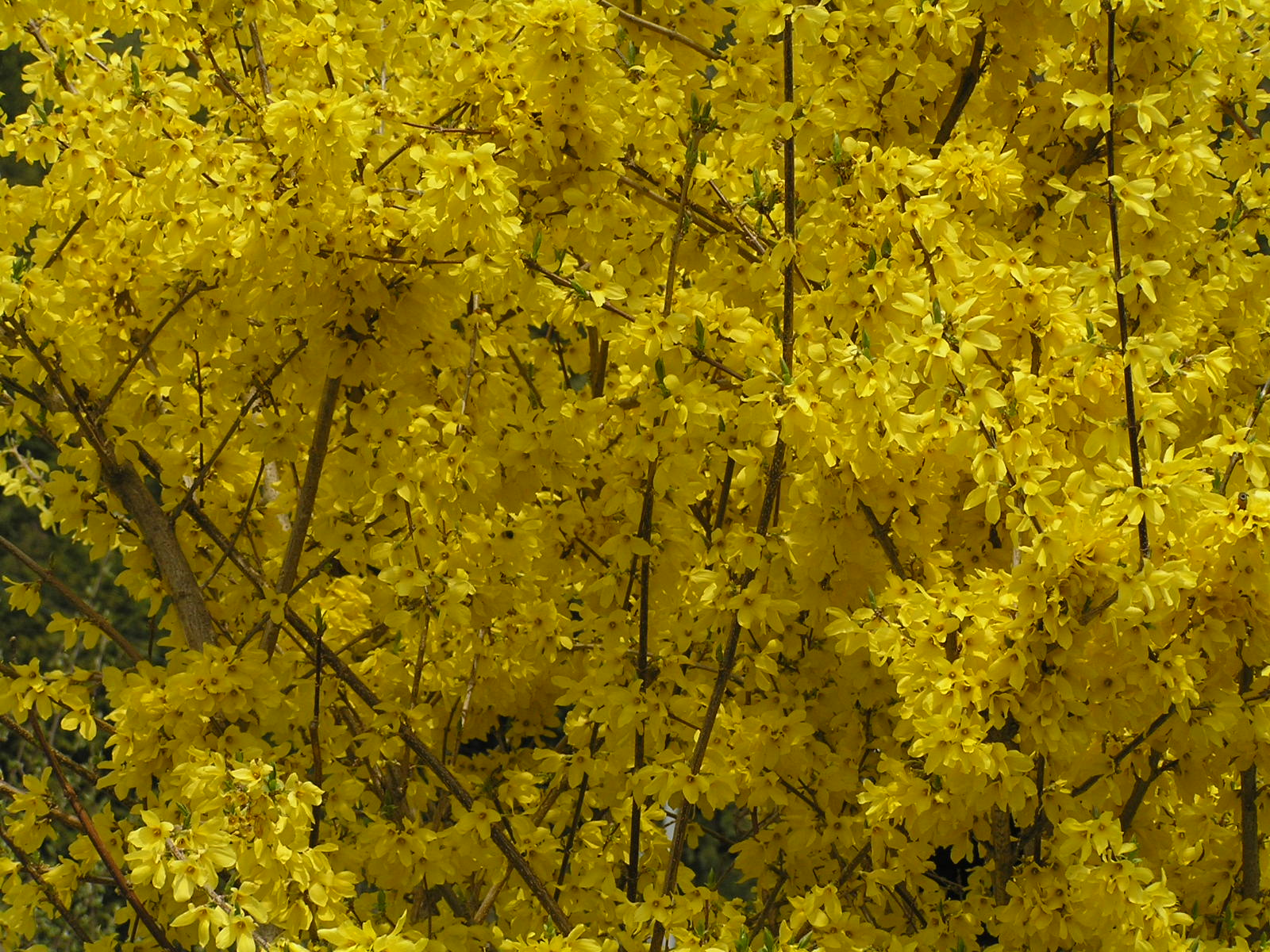
Forsythia in full bloom

Two species of forsythia are at the heart of the selected forms and garden hybrids: Forsythia suspensa and F. viridissima. "These two species are, as it were, the founder-members of the forsythia family" writes Alice Coats; they were the earliest species brought into Western gardens from the Far East and they have each played a role in the modern garden shrubs.

Forsythia suspensa, the first to be noticed by a Westerner, was seen in a Japanese garden by the botanist-surgeon Carl Peter Thunberg, who included it (as a lilac) in his Flora Japonica 1784. Thunberg's professional connections lay with the Dutch East India Company, and F. suspensa reached Holland first, by 1833. In England, when it was being offered by Veitch Nurseries in Exeter at mid-century, it was still considered a rarity. Not all the varieties of suspensa are splaying and drooping, best seen hanging over a retaining wall; an erect form found by Fortune near Peking in 1861 was for a time classed as a species—F. fortunei.

Forsythia viridissima, meanwhile, had overtaken it in European gardens. The Scottish plant-hunter Robert Fortune "discovered" it—in a mandarin garden of the coastal city of Chusan (Zhoushan)—before he ever saw it growing wild in the mountains in Zhejiang province.

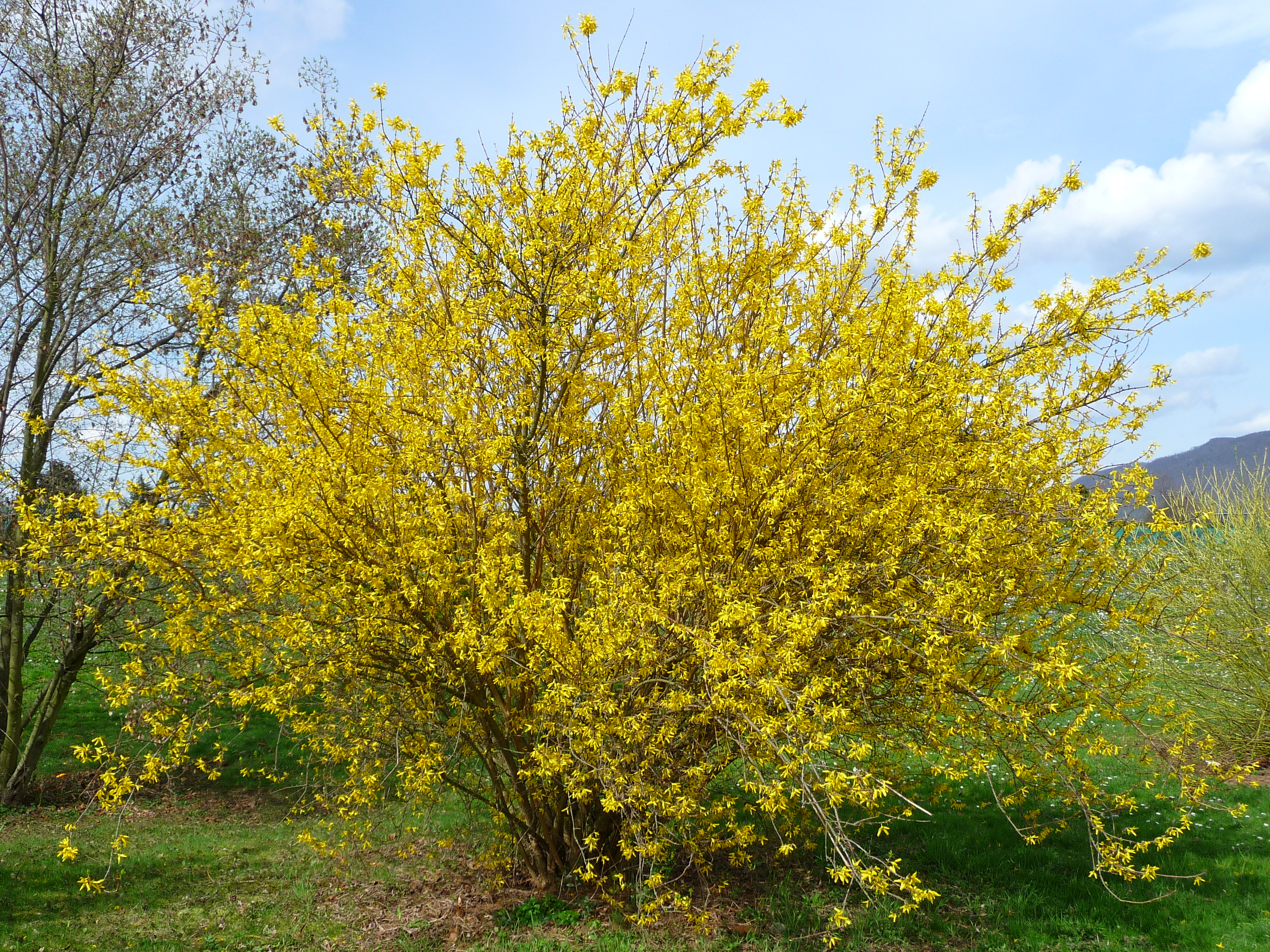
Forsythia × intermedia in Heidelberg, Germany

Forsythia × intermedia, as its name suggests, is a hybrid of F. suspensa and F. viridissima, introduced in continental Europe about 1880. Repeated crosses of the same two parents have made reiterations of F. × intermedia quite variable. A bud sport of a particularly showy (spectabilis) form is widely marketed as F. × intermedia 'Lynwood Variety'. This cultivar has gained the Royal Horticultural Society's Award of Garden Merit, as have F. × intermedia Week End 'Courtalyn' and F. Marée d'Or 'Courtasol'.

About the time of the First World War further species were discovered by plant hunters in China: F. giraldian (found in Gansu, 1910) and F. ovata (collected from seed in Korea by E.H. Wilson) have been particularly useful as seed parents in 20th-century American crosses.

== Cultivation ==
Forsythia are early spring-flowering shrubs with yellow blooms, often seen in private gardens, public landscaping works and parks—notably during Eastertide, when some of the plants are nicknamed Easter Tree in honor of the coming spring. Two species/hybrids are commonly cultivated for ornamental use, Forsythia × intermedia and F. suspensa. They are grown in several climates and gardening zones, prized for being tough and reliable perennial plants. F. × intermedia is the more commonly grown, smaller plant and has an upright habit with vivid flowers. F. suspensa is a large to very large shrub with paler blossoms, and can be grown in a weeping shape on banks. Many named garden cultivars can also be found. Budding Forsythia cuttings are frequently brought indoors, for their opening blooms, in the early spring.

Vegetative propagation is usually achieved via cuttings, taken from green wood after flowering in late spring to early summer. Alternatively, cuttings may be taken between November and February, though this may reduce the flowering spectacle of the following spring. Low-hanging boughs that touch the ground will often take root, adding to the total mass of the plant, but can be removed for transplanting. A common practice (known as layering) is to place a weight over a branch to keep it on the ground and, after it has rooted, to dig up the roots and cut the rooted part from the main branch; this can then be planted.

== Uses ==
=== Medicinal use ===
Forsythia suspensa is considered one of the 50 fundamental herbs in Chinese herbology. Forsythia fruits find use in traditional Chinese medicine in the treatment of bacterial infections and upper respiratory disease, by virtue of their antipyretic and anti-inflammatory properties. When used for these purposes, they are combined with other herbs - most notably with the flowers of certain species of Lonicera (honeysuckle). Furthermore, the fruits are also employed as a diuretic and as a 'cardiovascular tonic'. The species involved in such use are Forsythia suspensa, F. koreana, and F. viridissima.

=== Musical instrument ===
Forsythia sticks are used to bow a Korean stringed instrument called an ajaeng.

== Common names ==
In some regions, the plant may be known as Easter tree and the flowers as yellow bells. In Iran, the plant is known as "yellow Jasmine".

== Gallery ==
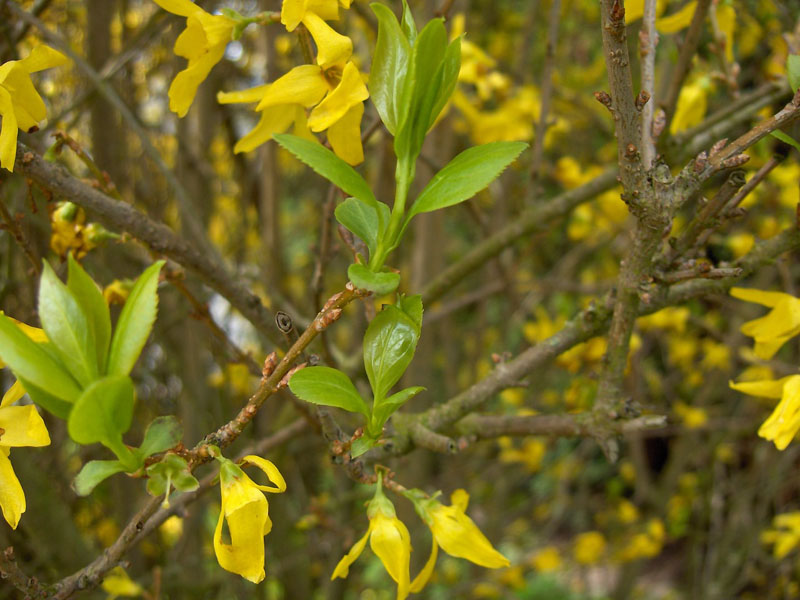
Forsythia × intermedia flowers and young leaves

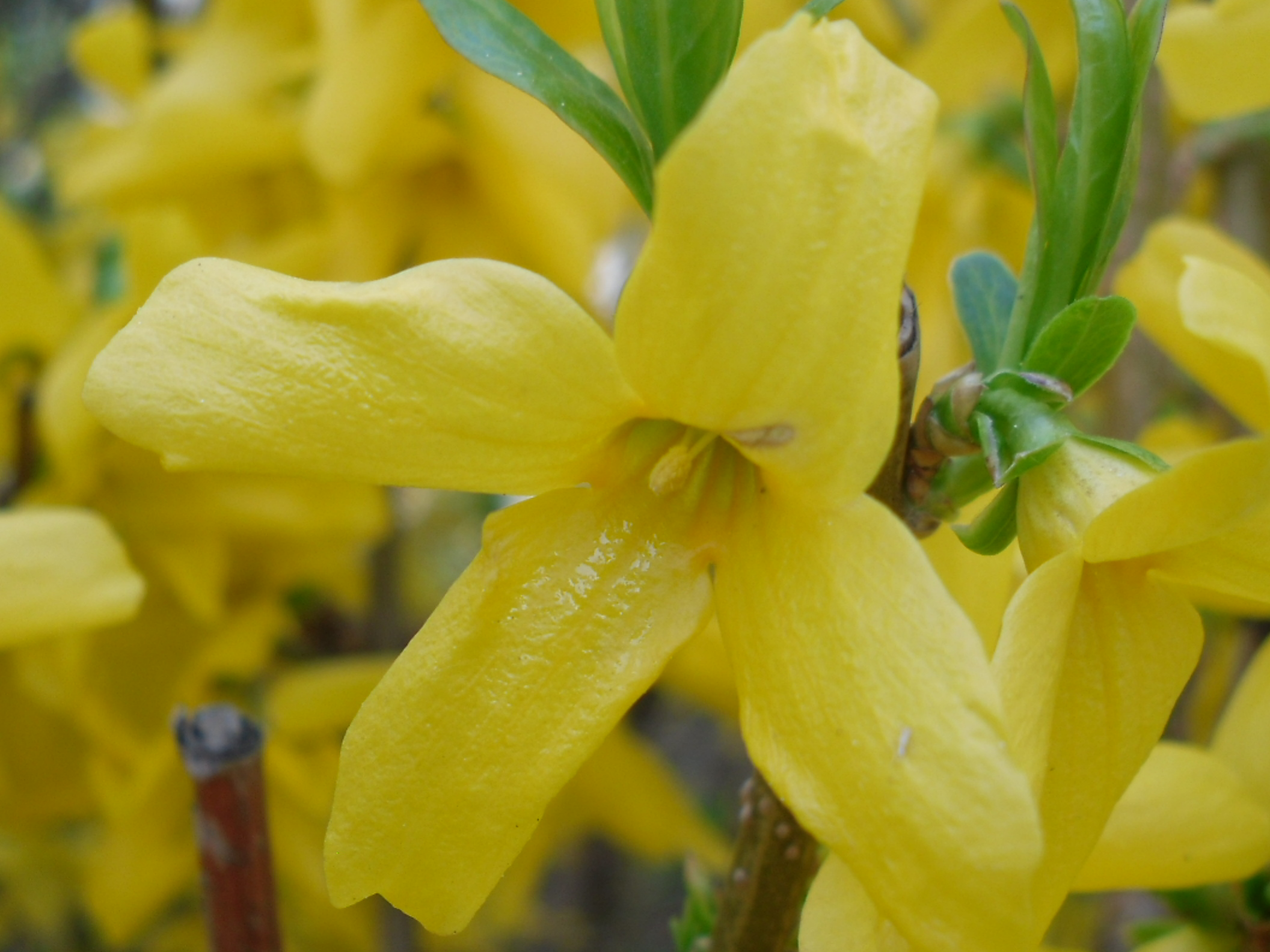
A Forsythia flower

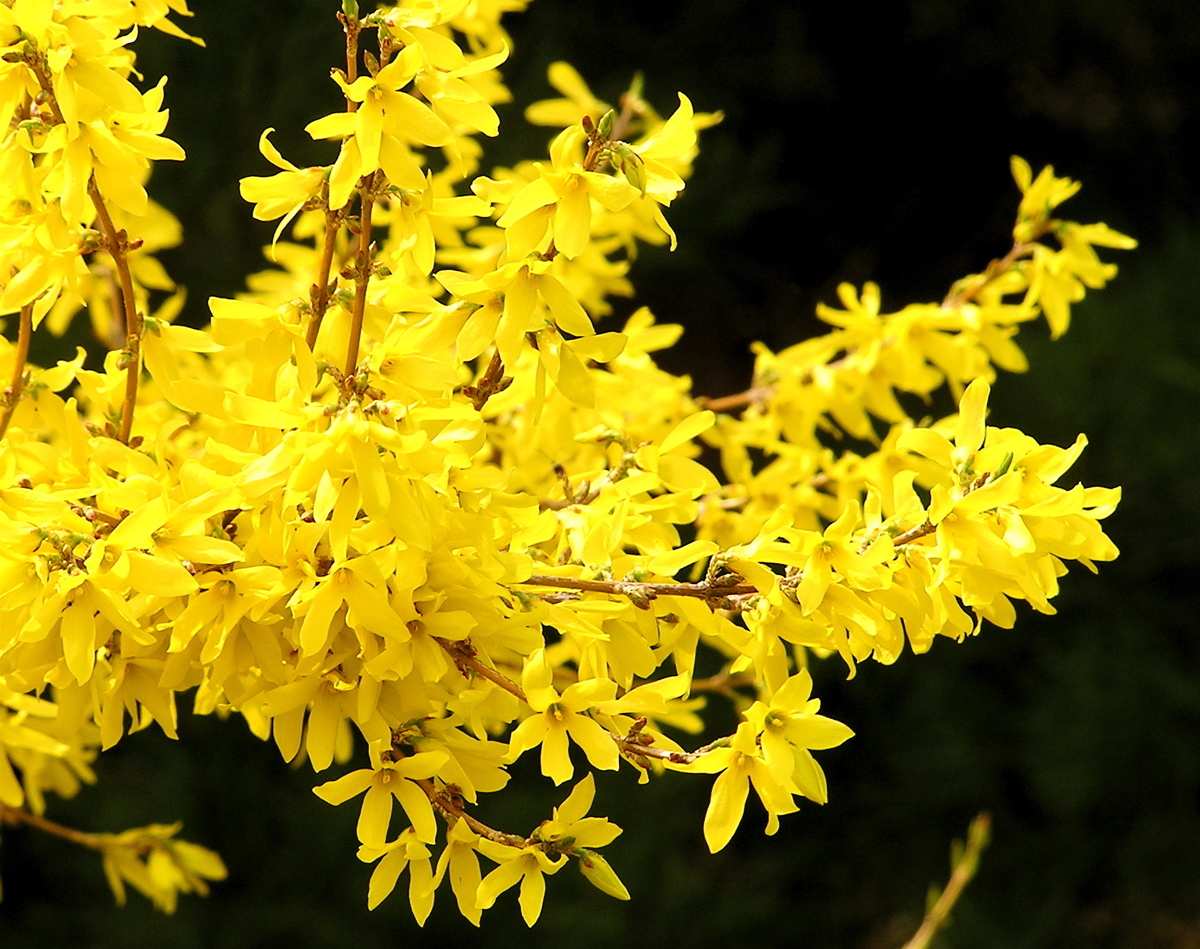
Forsythia flower

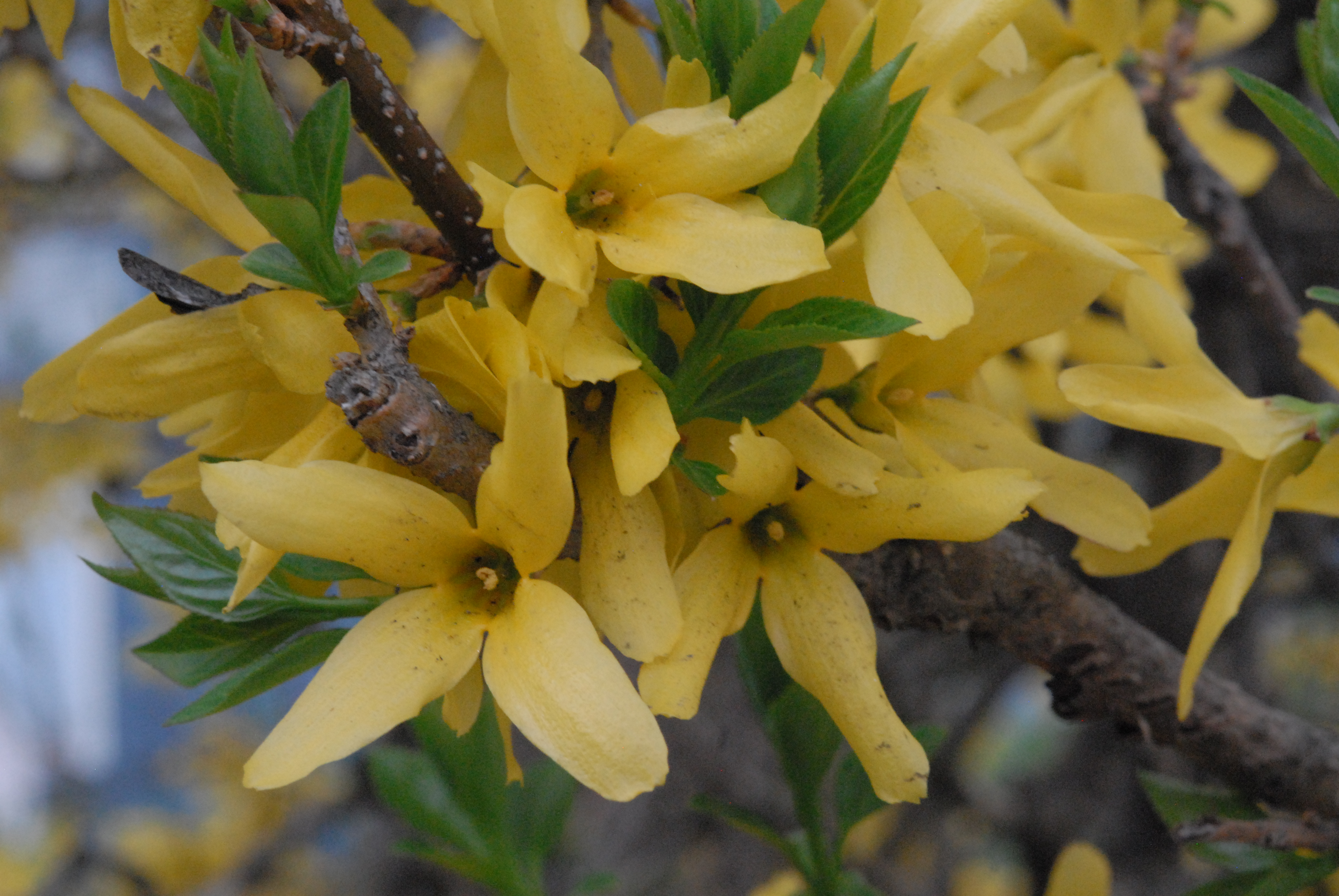
Close-up of Forsythia flowers

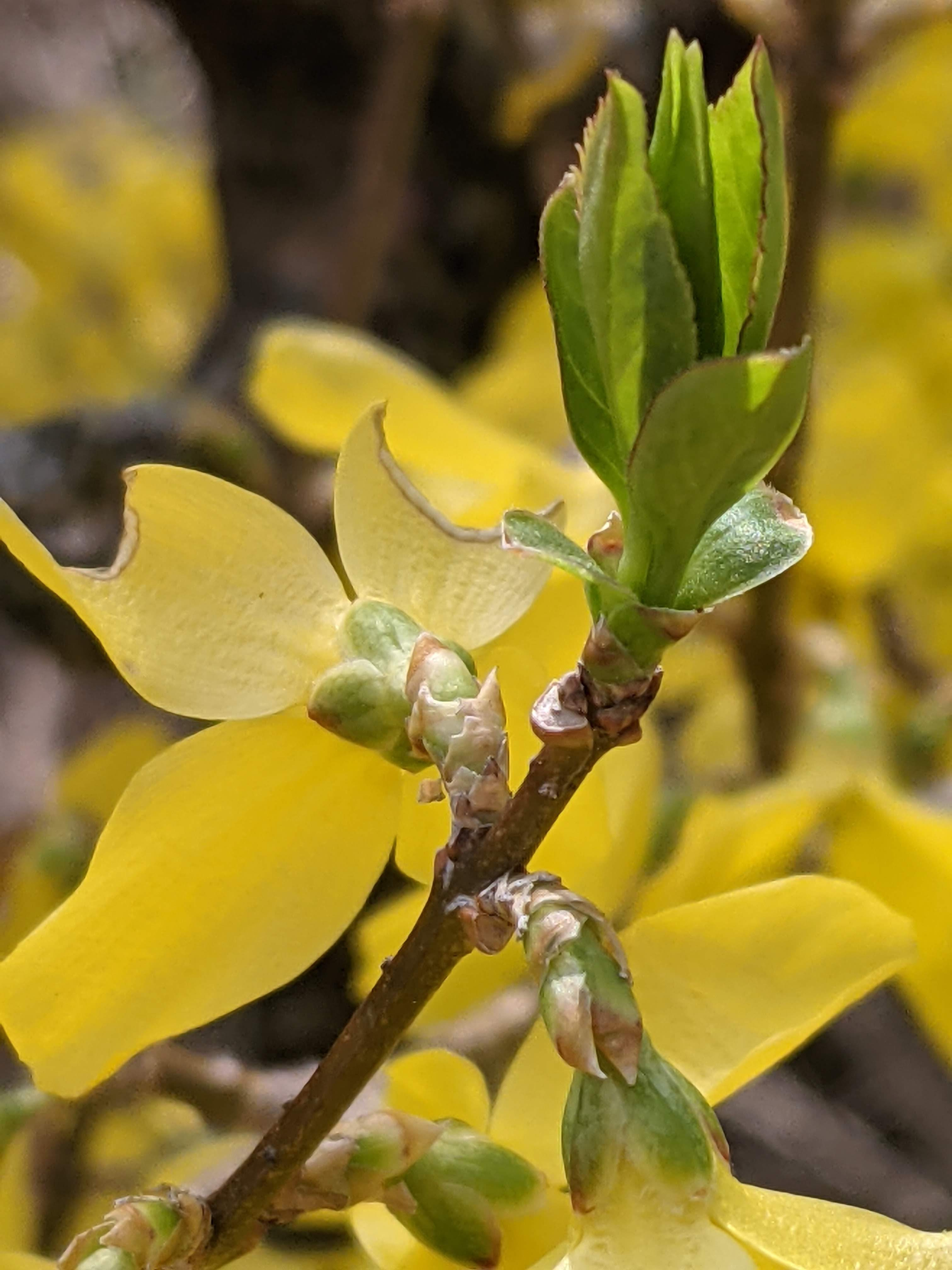
A budding Forsythia
