= Podophyllum resin =

Chemical compound

Clinical data
- Trade names: Podocon-25, others
- AHFS/Drugs.com: Monograph
- ATC code: D06BB04 (WHO)

Identifiers
- CAS Number: 9000-55-9
- ChemSpider: none
- UNII: 16902YVY2B
- ECHA InfoCard: 100.029.575

Podophyllum resin, also known as podophyllum or podophyllin, is a resin made from the roots of the American mandrake. It is used as a medication to treat genital warts and plantar warts, including in Immunosuppressed individuals, like people living with HIV/AIDS. It is not recommended in HPV infections without external warts. Application by a healthcare provider to the skin is recommended.

Common side effects include redness, itchiness, and pain at the site of use. Severe side effects may include vomiting, abdominal pain, confusion, bone marrow suppression, and diarrhea. It is not recommended for more than a small area at a time. Use during pregnancy is known to be dangerous to the baby. It works mostly via podophyllotoxin which stops cell division.

Podophyllin resin has been used to treat warts since at least 1820. It is on the World Health Organization's List of Essential Medicines. A formulation known as podophyllotoxin with fewer side effects is also available.
