= Genital wart =

Sexually transmitted infection caused by certain types of human papillomaviruses

Genital warts
- Other names: Condylomata acuminata, venereal warts, anal warts, anogenital warts
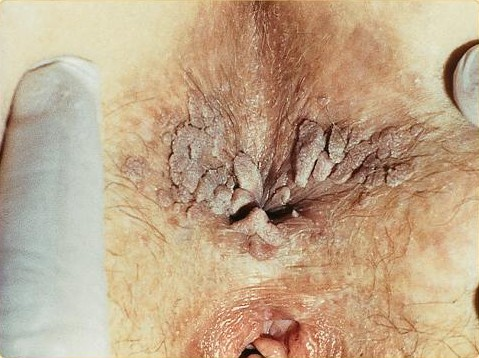
- Severe case of genital warts around the anus of a female
- Specialty: Infectious disease
- Symptoms: Small bumps in skin of genital area, varying sizes and shapes but typically protrude out, burning, itch
- Usual onset: 1-8 months following exposure
- Causes: HPV types 6 and 11
- Diagnostic method: Based on symptoms, can be confirmed by biopsy
- Differential diagnosis: Molluscum contagiosum, skin tag, condylomata lata, squamous-cell carcinoma
- Prevention: HPV vaccine, condoms
- Treatment: Medications, cryotherapy, surgery
- Medication: Podophyllin, imiquimod, trichloroacetic acid
- Frequency: ~1% (US)

Genital warts are a sexually transmitted infection caused by certain types of human papillomavirus (HPV). They may be flat or project out from the surface of the skin, and their color may vary; brownish, white, pale yellow, pinkish-red, or gray. There may be a few individual warts or several, either in a cluster or merged together to look cauliflower-shaped. They can be itchy and feel burning. Usually they cause few symptoms, but can occasionally be painful. Typically they appear one to eight months following exposure. Warts are the most easily recognized symptom of genital HPV infection.

HPV types 6 and 11 are responsible for causing the majority of genital warts whereas HPV types 16, 18, 31, 33, and 35 are also occasionally found. It is spread through direct skin-to-skin contact, usually during oral, manual, vaginal, or anal sex with an infected partner. Diagnosis is generally based on symptoms and can be confirmed by biopsy. The types of HPV that cause cancer are not the same as those that cause warts.

Some HPV vaccines can prevent genital warts as may condoms, with the quadrivalent and nonavalent vaccines providing virtually complete protection. Treatment options include creams such as podophyllin, imiquimod, and trichloroacetic acid. Cryotherapy or surgery may also be an option. After treatment warts often resolve within six months. Without treatment, in up to a third of cases they resolve on their own.

About 1% of people in the United States have genital warts. Many people, however, are infected and do not have symptoms. Without vaccination nearly all sexually active people will get some type of HPV at one point in their lives. The disease has been known at least since the time of Hippocrates in 300 BC.

== Signs and symptoms ==
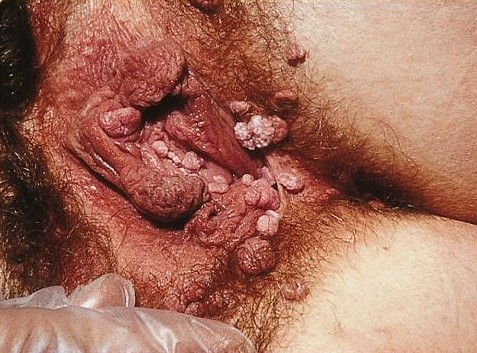
Severe case of genital warts on a vulva

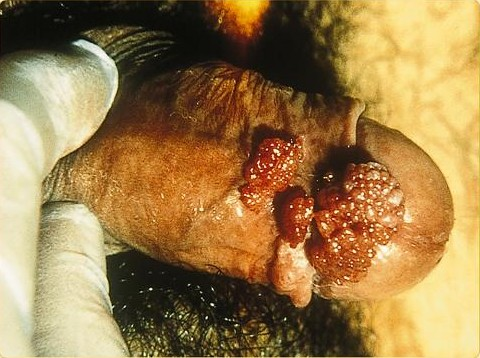
Severe case of genital warts on a penis

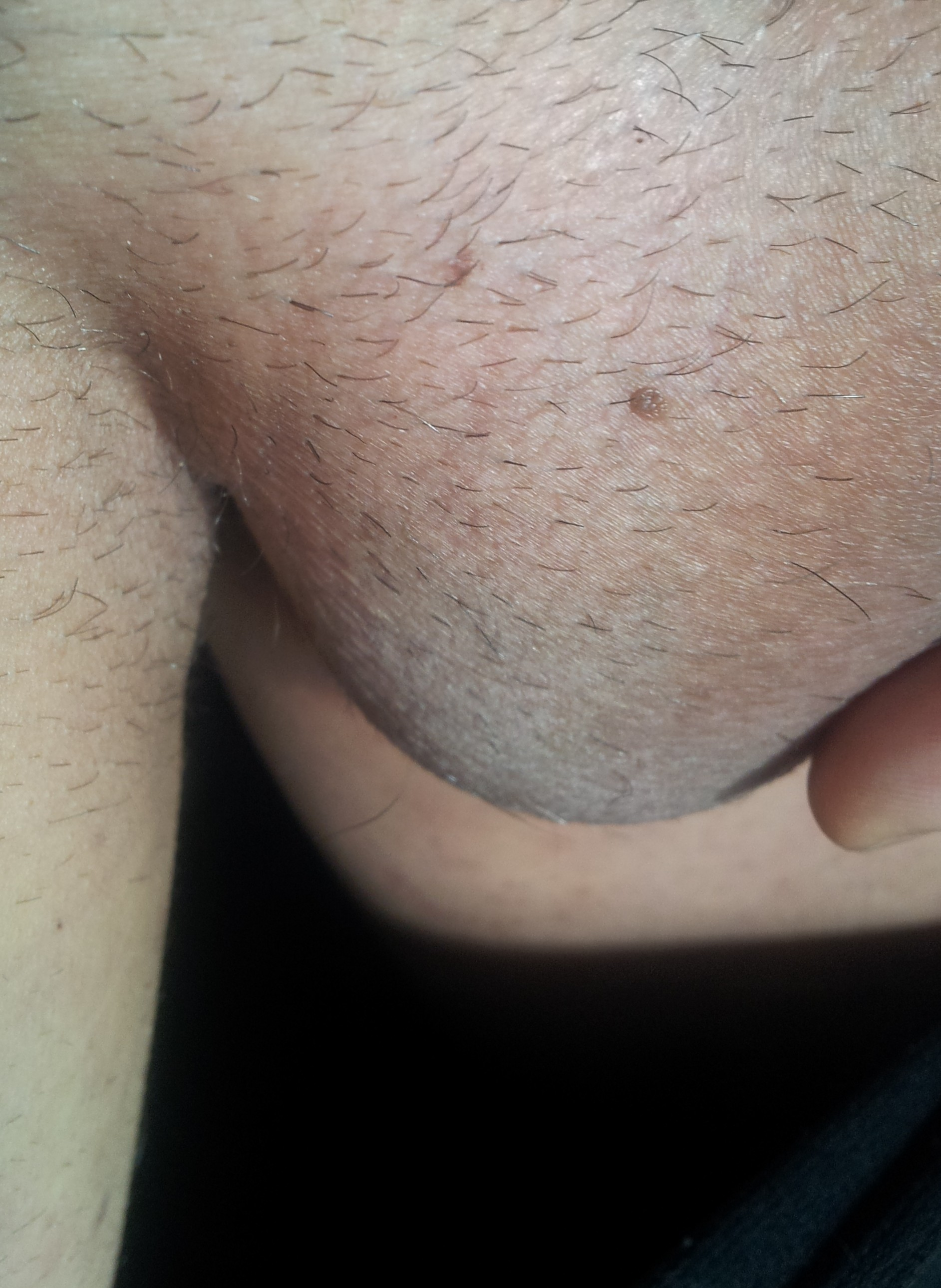
Small condylomata on a scrotum

They may be found anywhere in the anal or genital area, and are frequently found on external surfaces of the body, including the penile shaft, scrotum, or labia majora. They can also occur on internal surfaces like the opening to the urethra, inside the vagina, on the cervix, or in the anus.

They can be as small as 1–5 mm in diameter, but can also grow or spread into large masses in the genital or anal area. In some cases they look like small stalks. They may be hard ("keratinized") or soft. Their color can be variable, and sometimes they may bleed.

In most cases, there are no symptoms of HPV infection other than the warts themselves. Sometimes warts may cause itching, redness, or discomfort, especially when they occur around the anus. Although they are usually without other physical symptoms, an outbreak of genital warts may cause psychological distress, such as anxiety, in some people.

== Causes ==
=== Transmission ===
HPV is most commonly transmitted through penetrative sex. While HPV can also be transmitted via non-penetrative sexual activity, it is less transmissible than via penetrative sex. There is conflicting evidence about the effect of condoms on transmission of low-risk HPV. Some studies have suggested that they are effective at reducing transmission. Other studies suggest that condoms are not effective at preventing transmission of the low-risk HPV variants that cause genital warts. The effect of condoms on HPV transmission may also be sex-dependent; there is some evidence that condoms are more effective at preventing infection of males than of females.

The types of HPV that cause warts are highly transmissible. Roughly three out of four unaffected partners of patients with warts develop them within eight months. Other studies of partner concordance suggest that the presence of visible warts may be an indicator of increased infectivity; HPV concordance rates are higher in couples where one partner has visible warts.

=== Latency and recurrence ===
Although 90% of HPV infections are cleared by the body within two years of infection, it is possible for infected cells to undergo a latency (quiet) period, with the first occurrence or a recurrence of symptoms happening months or years later. Latent HPV, even with no outward symptoms, is still transmissible to a sexual partner. If an individual has unprotected sex with an infected partner, there is a 70% chance that he or she will also become infected.

In individuals with a history of previous HPV infection, the appearance of new warts may be either from a new exposure to HPV, or from a recurrence of the previous infection. As many as one-third of people with warts will experience a recurrence.

=== Children ===
Anal or genital warts may be transmitted during birth. The presence of wart-like lesions on the genitals of young children has been suggested as an indicator of sexual abuse. However, genital warts can sometimes result from autoinoculation by warts elsewhere on the body, such as from the hands. It has also been reported from sharing of swimsuits, underwear, or bath towels, and from non-sexual touching during routine care such as diapering. Genital warts in children are less likely to be caused by HPV subtypes 6 and 11 than adults, and more likely to be caused by HPV types that cause warts elsewhere on the body ("cutaneous types"). Surveys of pediatricians who are child abuse specialists suggest that in children younger than 4 years old, there is no consensus on whether the appearance of new anal or genital warts, by itself, can be considered an indicator of sexual abuse.

== Diagnosis ==
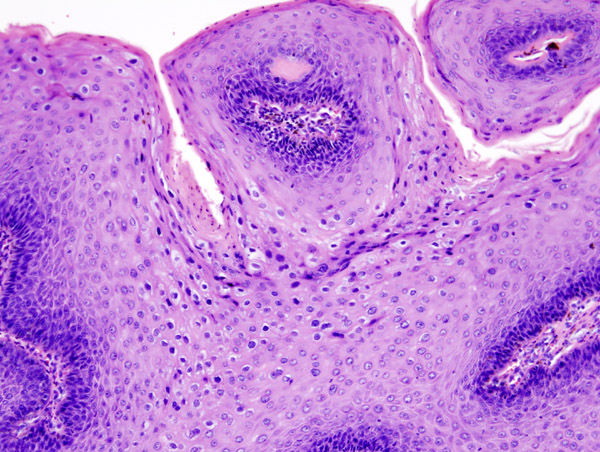
Micrograph of a genital wart with the characteristic changes (parakeratosis, koilocytes, papillomatosis). H&E stain.

The diagnosis of genital warts is most often made visually, but may require confirmation by biopsy in some cases. Smaller warts may occasionally be confused with molluscum contagiosum. Genital warts, histopathologically, characteristically rise above the skin surface due to enlargement of the dermal papillae, have parakeratosis and the characteristic nuclear changes typical of HPV infections (nuclear enlargement with perinuclear clearing). DNA tests are available for diagnosis of high-risk HPV infections. Because genital warts are caused by low-risk HPV types, DNA tests cannot be used for diagnosis of genital warts or other low-risk HPV infections.

Some practitioners use an acetic acid solution to identify smaller warts ("subclinical lesions"), but this practice is controversial. Because a diagnosis made with acetic acid will not meaningfully affect the course of the disease, and cannot be verified by a more specific test, a 2007 UK guideline advises against its use.

== Prevention ==
=== HPV vaccines ===
HPV vaccines have excellent safety profiles and are highly efficacious, or have met immunobridging standards. They prevent genital warts, with the quadrivalent and nonavalent vaccines providing virtually complete protection. As of 2022, 125 countries include HPV vaccine in their routine vaccinations for girls, and 47 countries recommend them for boys, as well.

There exists the nonavalent vaccine, Gardasil 9. The quadrivalent Gardasil (sold by Merck & Co.) is a vaccine that protects against infection by HPV types 6, 11, 16 and 18. Types 6 and 11 cause genital warts, while 16 and 18 cause cervical cancer. The vaccine is preventive, not therapeutic, and must be given before exposure to the virus type to be effective, ideally before the beginning of sexual activity. The vaccine is approved by the US Food and Drug Administration for use in both males and females as early as 9 years of age.

In the UK, Gardasil replaced Cervarix in September 2012 for reasons unrelated to safety. Cervarix had been used routinely in young females from its introduction in 2008, but was only effective against the high-risk HPV types 16 and 18, neither of which typically causes warts.

=== Condoms ===
There is conflicting evidence about the effect of condoms on transmission of low-risk HPV. Some studies have suggested that they are effective at reducing transmission. Other studies suggest that condoms are not effective at preventing transmission of the low-risk HPV variants that cause genital warts. The effect of condoms on HPV transmission may also be sex-dependent; there is some evidence that condoms are more effective at preventing infection of males than of females.

== Management ==
There is no cure for HPV. Existing treatments are directed towards the removal of visible warts, but these may also regress on their own without any therapy. There is no evidence to suggest that removing visible warts reduces transmission of the underlying HPV infection. As many as 80% of people with HPV will clear the infection within 18 months.

A healthcare practitioner may offer one of several ways to treat warts, depending on their number, sizes, locations, or other factors. All treatments can cause depigmentation, itching, pain, or scarring.

Treatments can be classified as either physically ablative, or topical agents. Physically ablative therapies are considered more effective at initial wart removal, but like all therapies have significant recurrence rates.

Many therapies, including folk remedies, have been suggested for treating genital warts, some of which have little evidence to suggest they are effective or safe. Those listed here are ones mentioned in national or international practice guidelines as having some basis in evidence for their use.

=== Physical ablation ===
Physically ablative methods are more likely to be effective on keratinized warts. They are also most appropriate for patients with fewer numbers of relatively smaller warts.

- Simple excision, such as with scissors under local anesthesia, is highly effective.
- Liquid nitrogen cryosurgery is usually performed in an office visit, at weekly intervals. It is effective, inexpensive, safe for pregnancy, and does not usually cause scarring.
- Electrocauterization (sometimes called "loop electrical excision procedure" or LEEP) is a procedure with a long history of use and is considered effective.
- Laser ablation has less evidence to suggest its use. It may be less effective than other ablative methods. It is extremely expensive, and often used as a last resort.
- Formal surgical procedures, performed by a specialist under general anesthesia or spinal anesthesia may be necessary for larger or more extensive warts, intra-anal warts, or warts in children. It carries a greater risk of scarring than other methods.

=== Topical agents ===
- A 0.15–0.5% podophyllotoxin (also called podofilox) solution in a gel or cream. It can be applied by the patient to the affected area and is not washed off. It is the purified and standardized active ingredient of podophyllin (see below). Podofilox is safer and more effective than podophyllin. Skin erosion and pain are more commonly reported than with imiquimod and sinecatechins. Its use is cycled (two times per day for 3 days then 4–7 days off); one review states that it should only be used for four cycles.
- Imiquimod is a topical immune response cream, applied to the affected area. It causes less local irritation than podofilox but may cause fungal infections (11% in package insert) and flu-like symptoms (less than 5% disclosed in package insert). It does not significantly impact the occurrence of new warts or the systemic reactions.
- Sinecatechins is an ointment of catechins (55% epigallocatechin gallate) extracted from green tea and other components. Mode of action is undetermined. It appears to have higher clearance rates than podophyllotoxin and imiquimod and causes less local irritation, but clearance takes longer than with imiquimod.
- Trichloroacetic acid (TCA) is less effective than cryosurgery, and is not recommended for use in the vagina, cervix, or urinary meatus.
- Interferon can be used; it is effective, but it is also expensive and its effect is inconsistent.

==== Discontinued ====
- A 5% 5-fluorouracil (5-FU) cream was used, but it is no longer considered an acceptable treatment due to the side-effects.

Podophyllin, podofilox and isotretinoin should not be used during pregnancy, as they could cause birth defects in the fetus.

=== Oral agents ===
Isotretinoin taken orally has been shown to treat recalcitrant condylomata acuminata (RCA) of the cervix.

== Epidemiology ==
Genital HPV infections have an estimated prevalence in the US of 10–20% and clinical manifestations in 1% of the sexually active adult population. US incidence of HPV infection has increased between 1975 and 2006. About 80% of those infected are between the ages of 17 and 33. Although treatments can remove warts, they do not remove the HPV, so warts can recur after treatment (about 50–73% of the time). Warts can also spontaneously regress (with or without treatment).

Traditional theories postulated that the virus remained in the body for a lifetime. However, studies using sensitive DNA techniques have shown that through immunological response, the virus can either be cleared or suppressed to levels below what polymerase chain reaction (PCR) tests can measure. One study testing genital skin for subclinical HPV using PCR found a prevalence of 10%.

== Etymology ==
A condyloma acuminatum is a single genital wart, and condylomata acuminata are multiple genital warts. The word roots mean 'pointed wart' (from Greek κόνδυλος 'knuckle', Greek -ωμα -oma 'disease', and Latin acuminatum 'pointed'). Although similarly named, it is not the same as condyloma latum, which is a complication of secondary syphilis.
