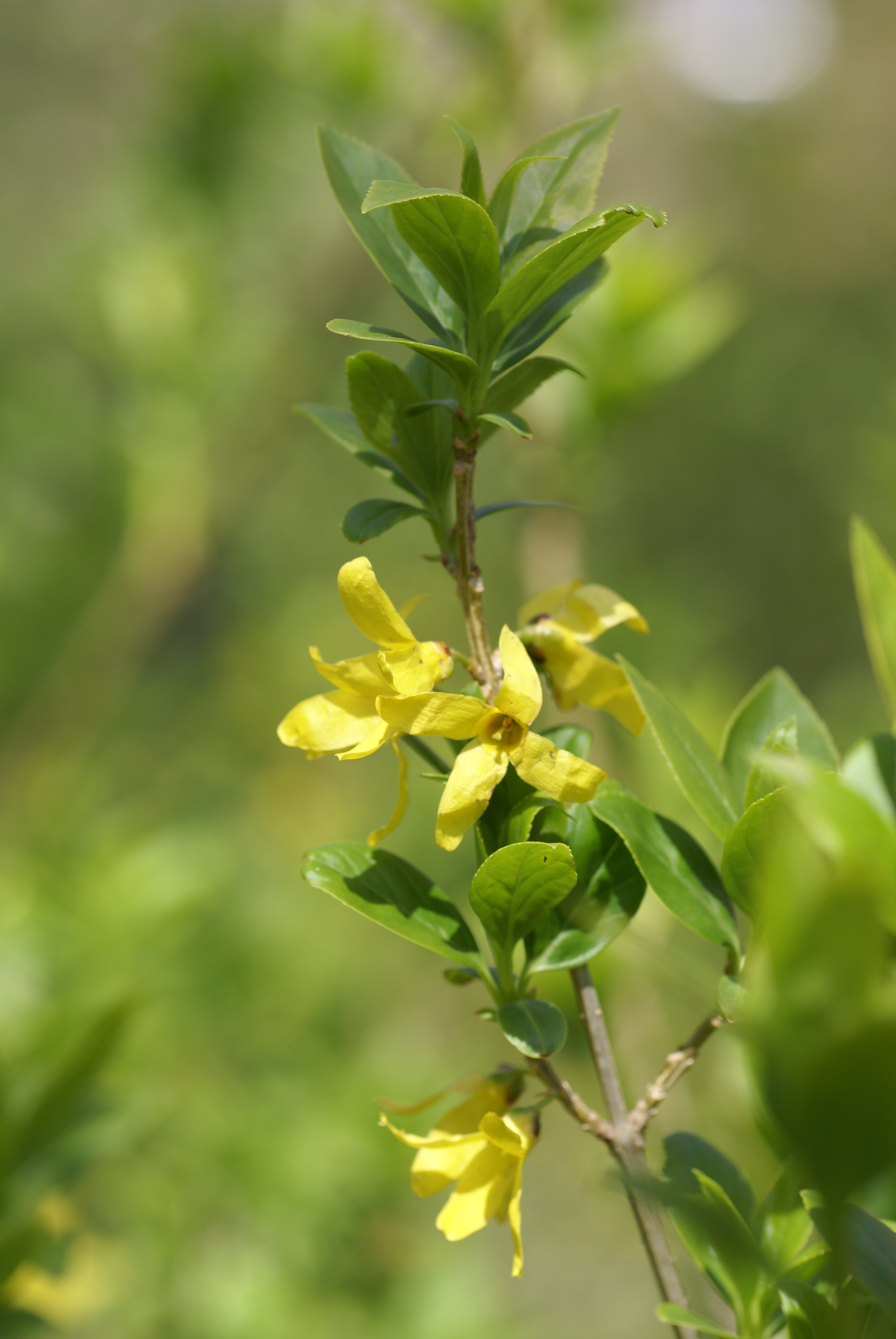
- April, Tokyo
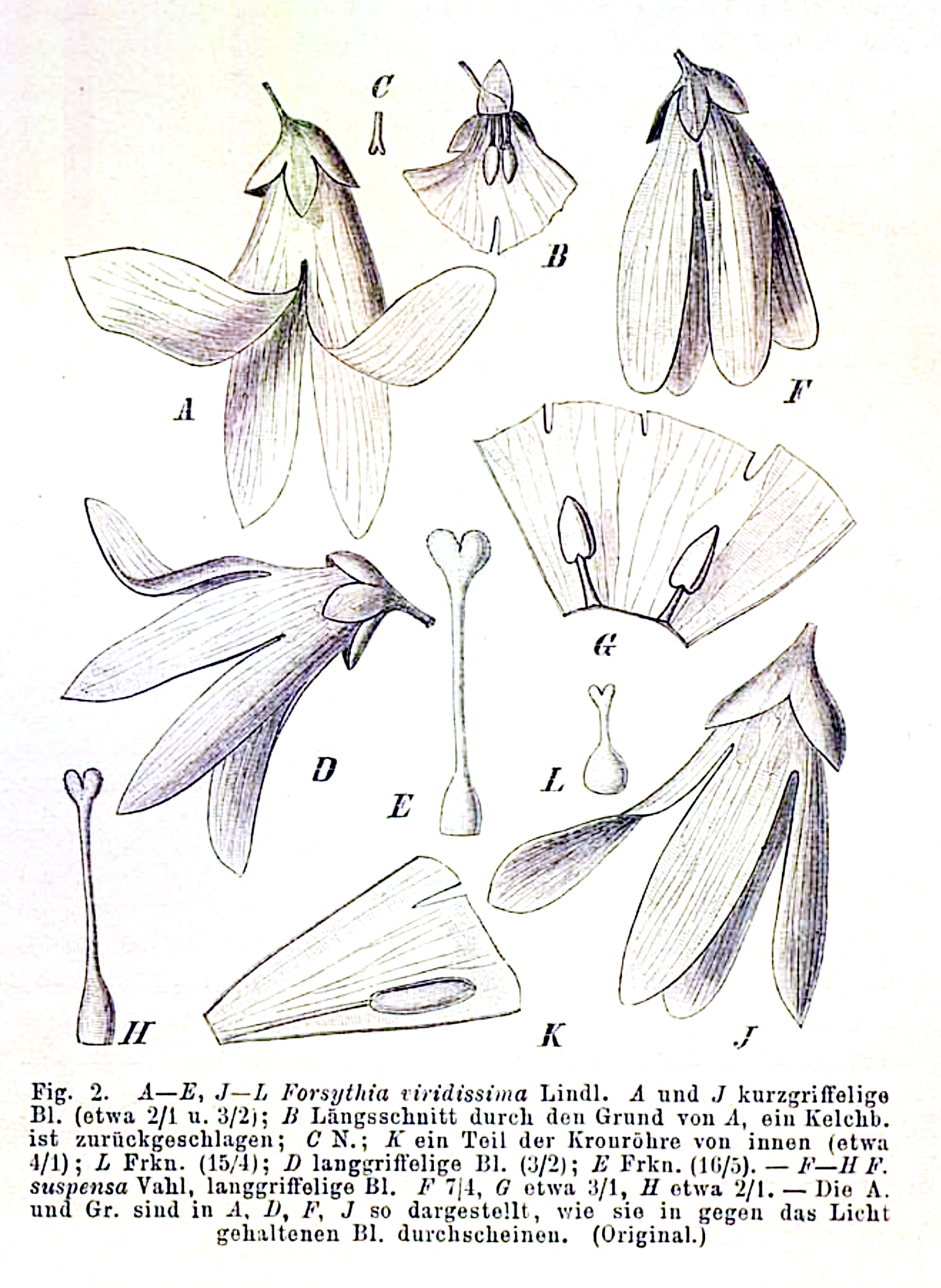
- Botanical illustration

Scientific classification
- Kingdom: Plantae
- Clade: Embryophytes
- Clade: Tracheophytes
- Clade: Spermatophytes
- Clade: Angiosperms
- Clade: Eudicots
- Clade: Asterids
- Order: Lamiales
- Family: Oleaceae
- Genus: Forsythia
- Species: F. viridissima

Binomial name
- Forsythia viridissima Lindl.

Synonyms
- Forsythia viridissima var. incisa Geerinck; Rangium viridissimum (Lindl.) Ohwi

= Forsythia viridissima =

Species of flowering plant

Forsythia viridissima, variously called the Chinese golden bell tree, green-stemmed forsythia, greenstem forsythia, and Korean forsythia, is a species of flowering plant in the genus Forsythia, native to southern China and South Korea, and introduced to Japan and the United States. It flowers about two weeks later than other forsythias. It may be of hybrid origin and is believed to be one of the parents of Forsythia × intermedia.
