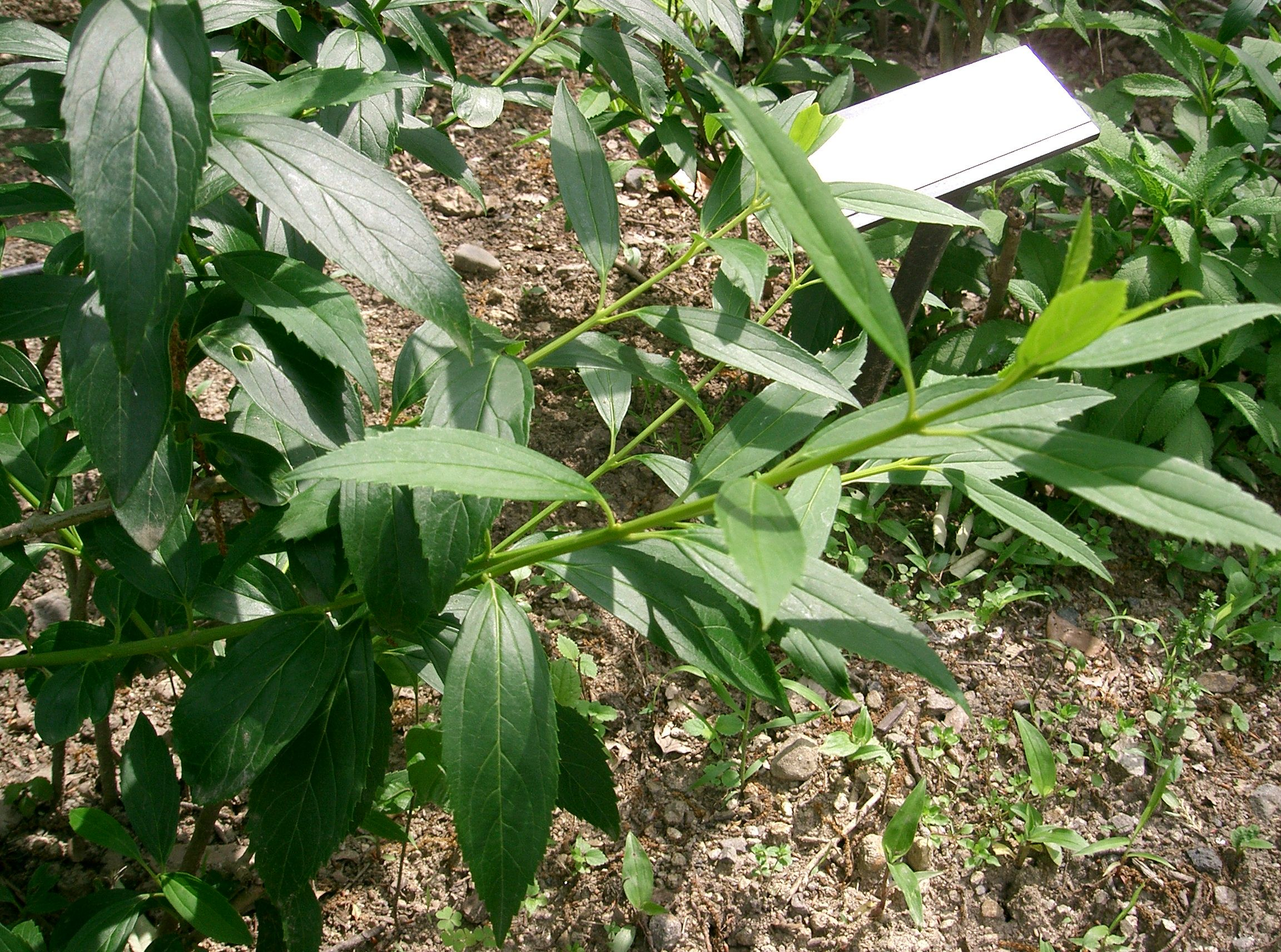

Scientific classification
- Kingdom: Plantae
- Clade: Embryophytes
- Clade: Tracheophytes
- Clade: Angiosperms
- Clade: Eudicots
- Clade: Asterids
- Order: Lamiales
- Family: Oleaceae
- Genus: Forsythia
- Species: F. suspensa

Binomial name
- Forsythia suspensa (Thunb.) Vahl

Synonyms
- Forsythia fortunei Lindl.; Forsythia giraldiana f. pubescens (Rehder) C.S.Niu; Forsythia sieboldii (Zabel) Dippel; Ligustrum suspensum Thunb.; Lilac perpensa Lam.; Rangium suspensum (Thunb.) Ohwi; Syringa suspensa Thunb.

= Forsythia suspensa =

Species of flowering plant in the olive family

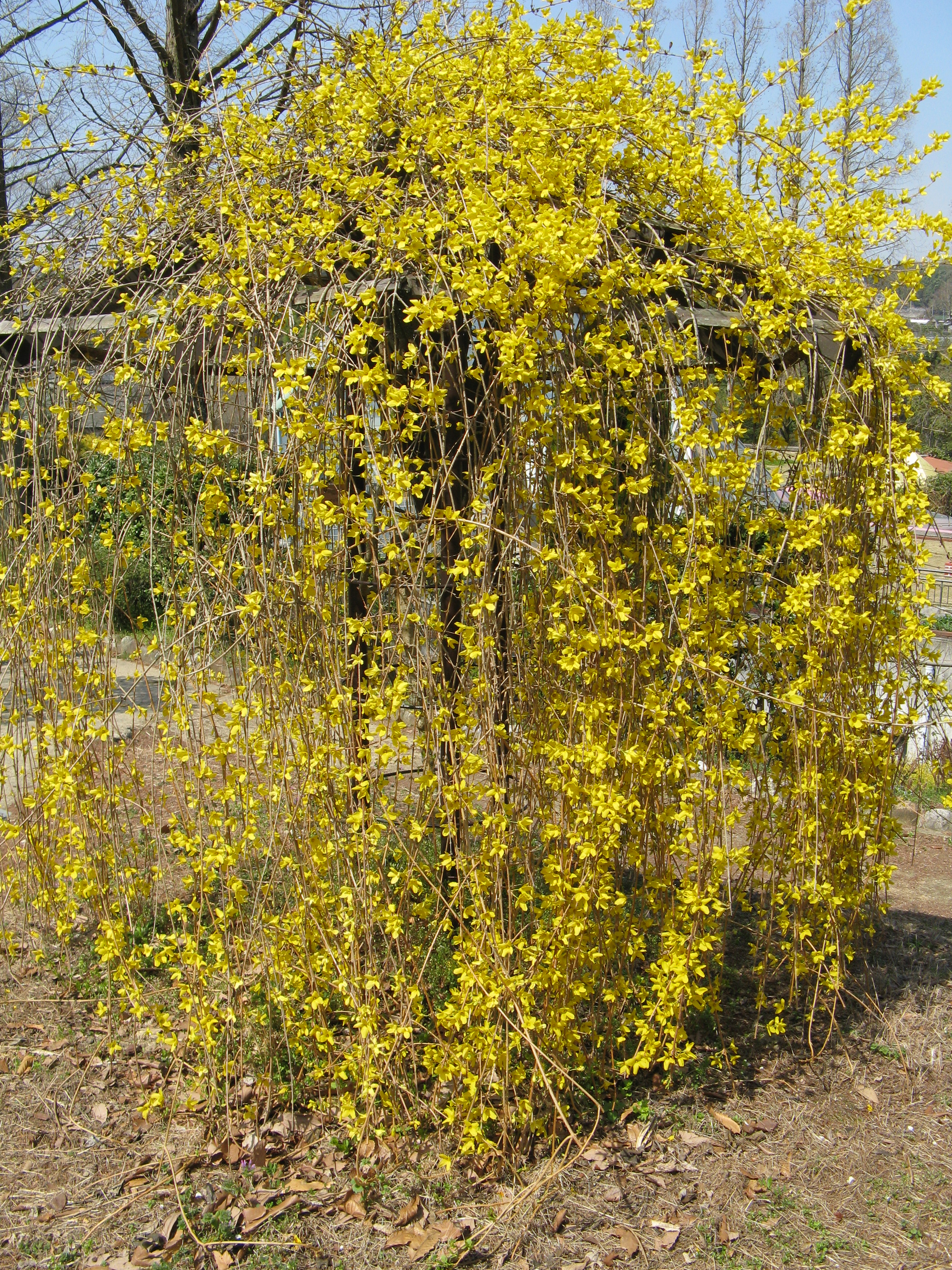

Forsythia suspensa, commonly known as weeping forsythia or golden-bell, is a species of flowering plant in the family Oleaceae. It is native to China.

== Taxonomy ==
The Latin epithet of suspensa is derived from suspensus meaning suspended. It was first described and published in Enum. Pl. Obs. Vol.1 on page 39 in 1804.

== Description ==
Forsythia suspensa is a deciduous shrub that grows up to 3 metres (9.8 feet) tall. Its flowers are golden-yellow and they bloom March to April. Leaves are green in color, broadly-ovate, and simple.

It can be grown as a weeping shrub on stream banks and can be identified by its pale flowers. Garden cultivars can be found. It is a spring flowering shrub, with yellow flowers. It is grown and prized for its toughness. Before Forsythia × intermedia was known as a true wild Chinese species, F. suspensa was considered one of its parents.

== Distribution and habitat ==
Forsythia suspensa is native to China. It is introduced in Japan, Spain, Bulgaria, Czechia, Slovakia, Korea and as well as some parts of the United States. It grows in thickets or grassy areas on slopes and valleys.

== Uses ==
It is one of the 50 fundamental herbs used in traditional Chinese medicine. It contains the lignans Pinoresinol and phillyrin.

== Chemistry ==
rengyol, rengyoxide, and rengyolone
