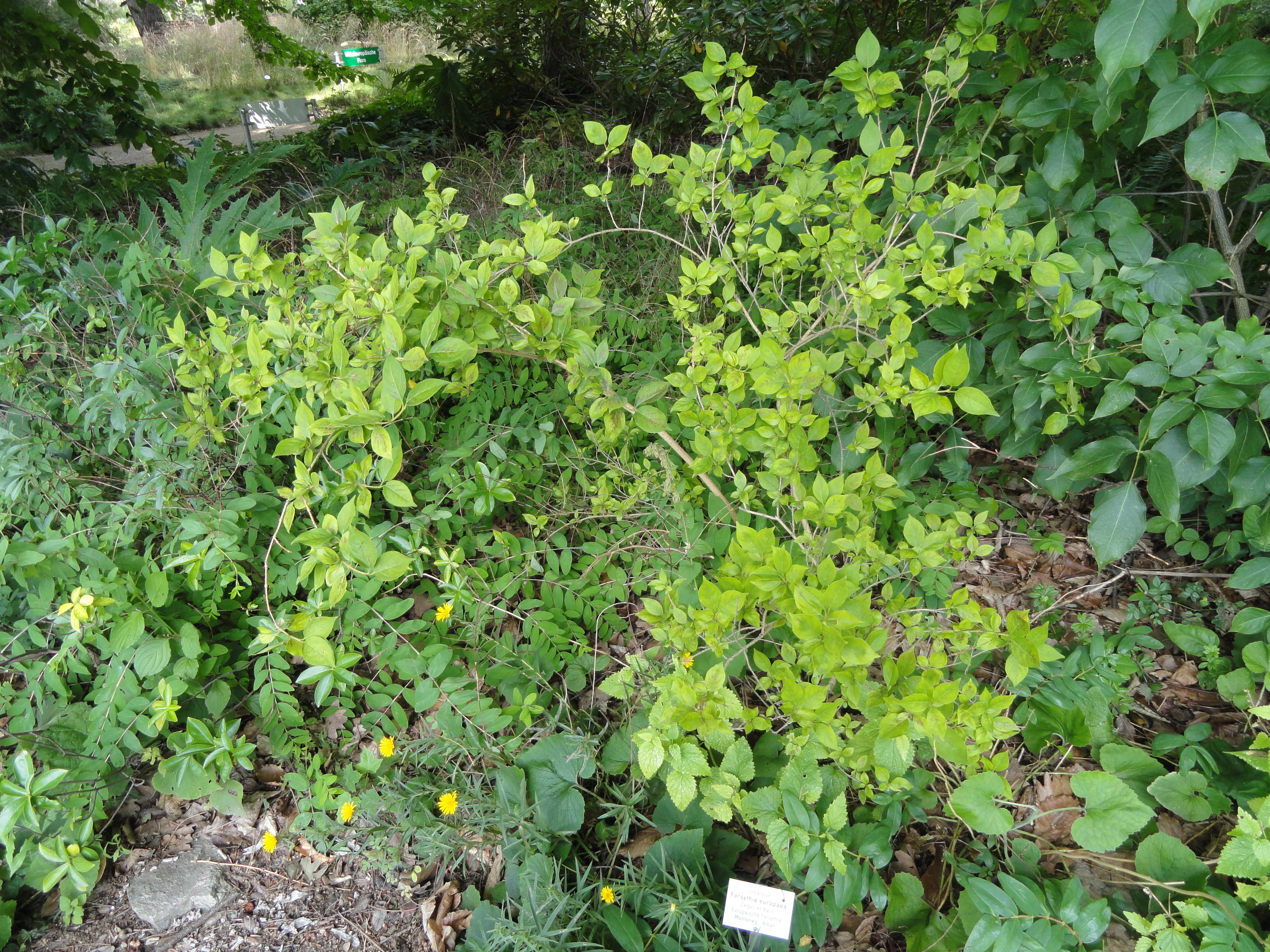

Conservation status
- Least Concern (IUCN 3.1)

Scientific classification
- Kingdom: Plantae
- Clade: Tracheophytes
- Clade: Angiosperms
- Clade: Eudicots
- Clade: Asterids
- Order: Lamiales
- Family: Oleaceae
- Genus: Forsythia
- Species: F. europaea

Binomial name
- Forsythia europaea Degen & Bald.

= Forsythia europaea =

Species of flowering plant

Forsythia europaea, commonly known as Albanian forsythia or European forsythia, is a species of flowering plant in the olive family, with a native range from Montenegro to northern Albania. It is the only species of Forsythia native to Europe; prior to its discovery in Albania in 1897, it was thought that all species within the genus Forsythia were native to East Asia.

== Description ==
F. europaea is a shrub, and can grow up to 10 ft (3 m) tall. Its leaves are 5–8 cm (2.0–3.1 in) in length, and are generally entire (smooth edged). It produces numerous yellow flowers, which are 1.25 in (3.2 cm) in diameter.

The shrub produces prolonged elliptical fruit capsules that grow to 5.4−6.0 mm by 1.8−2.2 mm. The fruit capsules have a fine granulate, slightly lustrous, glabrous, gold-yellow to brown appearance.

== Phylogeny ==
The closest relative of F. europaea is F. giraldiana, a species of Forsythia native to China. It was originally thought that a divergence between the two species occurred only half a million years ago, but more recent studies show that it is more likely that this happened between 2 and 10 million years ago. This is attributed to a significant shift in climate due to eurasian glaciation.

== Cultivation ==
F. europaea was first cultivated in 1899, at Kew Gardens in London, United Kingdom. It is not as widely cultivated as other species of Forsythia as it is not as ornamental, although it is still occasionally grown in parks and gardens.

Cultivars produced by hybridisation of F. europaea with F. ovata, a more ornamental species of Forsythia native to Korea, include:

- Forsythia 'Meadowlark', which was developed at North Dakota State University. It produces deep-yellow flowers from its third year onwards, the buds of which are hardy to −35 °F (−37 °C). Its leaves are ivy-green.
- Forsythia 'Northern Sun', which was developed at the University of Minnesota. It grows 10 ft (3 m) tall and 8 ft (2.4 m) wide. Plants produce large, gold-coloured flowers, the buds of which are hardy to −30 °F (−34 °C).
