= Phillyrin =

Names
- IUPAC name (7α,7′β,8α,8′α)-3,3′,4′-Trimethoxy-7,9′:7′,9-diepoxylignan-4-yl β-D-glucopyranoside
- Systematic IUPAC name (2S,3R,4S,5S,6R)-2-{4-[(1R,3aR,4S,6aR)-4-(3,4-Dimethoxyphenyl)tetrahydro-1H,3H-furo[3,4-c]furan-1-yl]-2-methoxyphenoxy}-6-(hydroxymethyl)oxane-3,4,5-triol
- Other names Forsythin

Identifiers
CAS Number	487-41-2
3D model (JSmol)	Interactive image
ChEBI	CHEBI:80888
ChEMBL	ChEMBL462767
ChemSpider	91900
KEGG	C17048
PubChem CID	44584288
UNII	VE9P4964MG
- InChI: InChI=1S/C27H34O11/c1-32-17-6-4-13(8-19(17)33-2)25-15-11-36-26(16(15)12-35-25)14-5-7-18(20(9-14)34-3)37-27-24(31)23(30)22(29)21(10-28)38-27/h4-9,15-16,21-31H,10-12H2,1-3H3/t15-,16-,21+,22+,23-,24+,25+,26-,27+/m0/s1 Key: KFFCKOBAHMGTMW-GBRPDIMTSA-N
- SMILES: COC1=C(C=C(C=C1)[C@@H]2[C@H]3CO[C@H]([C@H]3CO2)C4=CC(=C(C=C4)O[C@H]5[C@@H]([C@H]([C@@H]([C@H](O5)CO)O)O)O)OC)OC

Properties
Chemical formula	C_{27}H_{34}O_{11}
Molar mass	534.558 g·mol^{−1}
- Except where otherwise noted, data are given for materials in their standard state (at 25 °C [77 °F], 100 kPa). Infobox references

Phillyrin is a chemical compound isolated from fungi. It can be produced by Colletotrichum gloeosporioides, an endophytic fungus isolated from the plant weeping forsythia (Forsythia suspensa). It can also be isolated directly from Forsythia suspensa.
