= Condylomata lata =

- Specialty: Dermatology

Condylomata lata (sing. condyloma latum, in English also condyloma lata) is a cutaneous condition characterized by wart-like lesions on the genitals. They are generally symptoms of the secondary phase of syphilis, caused by the spirochete Treponema pallidum. Condylomata lata occurs in about one-third of secondary syphilis patients and is characterized by painless, mucosal, and warty erosions which are flat, velvety, moist and broad base in nature. They tend to develop in warm, moist sites of the genitals and perineum. These lesions hold a high accumulation of spirochetes and are highly infectious. Complete resolution of the lesions is spontaneous and occurs after a few days to many weeks, where it is either resolved completely or enters the tertiary phase, defined by a latent state.

== See also ==
- Chromobacteriosis infection
- List of cutaneous conditions
