= Pinoresinol =

- Chemical structure of pinoresinol

Names
- IUPAC names (+) form: 4-[(3S,3aR,6S,6aR)-6-(4-hydroxy-3-methoxyphenyl)-1,3,3a,4,6,6a-hexahydrofuro[3,4-c]furan-3-yl]-2-methoxyphenol; (7α,7′α,8α,8′α)-3,3′-dimethoxy-7,9′:7′,9-diepoxylignane-4,4′-diol
- Other names (+)-Pinoresinol (-)-Pinoresinol

Identifiers
CAS Number	487-36-5
3D model (JSmol)	Interactive image
ChEMBL	ChEMBL487611
ChemSpider	66116
KEGG	C05366
PubChem CID	73399
UNII	V4N1UDY811
CompTox Dashboard (EPA)	DTXSID20964099
- InChI: InChI=1S/C20H22O6/c1-23-17-7-11(3-5-15(17)21)19-13-9-26-20(14(13)10-25-19)12-4-6-16(22)18(8-12)24-2/h3-8,13-14,19-22H,9-10H2,1-2H3/t13-,14-,19+,20+/m0/s1 Key: HGXBRUKMWQGOIE-AFHBHXEDSA-N; InChI=1/C20H22O6/c1-23-17-7-11(3-5-15(17)21)19-13-9-26-20(14(13)10-25-19)12-4-6-16(22)18(8-12)24-2/h3-8,13-14,19-22H,9-10H2,1-2H3/t13-,14-,19+,20+/m0/s1 Key: HGXBRUKMWQGOIE-AFHBHXEDBE
- SMILES: COC1=C(C=CC(=C1)C2C3COC(C3CO2)C4=CC(=C(C=C4)O)OC)O

Properties
Chemical formula	C_{20}H_{22}O_{6}
Molar mass	358.38 g/mol
- Except where otherwise noted, data are given for materials in their standard state (at 25 °C [77 °F], 100 kPa). verify (what is ?) Infobox references

Pinoresinol is a tetrahydrofuran lignan found in Styrax sp., Forsythia suspensa, and in Forsythia koreana. It is also found in the caterpillar of the cabbage butterfly, Pieris rapae where it serves as a defence against ants.

In food, it is found in sesame seed, in Brassica vegetables and in olive oil. Pinoresinol has also been found to be toxic to larvae of the milkweed bug Oncopeltus fasciatus and of the haematophagous insect Rhodnius prolixus, which is a vector of chagas disease.

Currently, pinoresinol is isolated from plants with low efficiency and low yield.

== Biosynthesis ==
A first dirigent protein was discovered in Forsythia intermedia. This protein has been found to direct the stereoselective biosynthesis of (+)-pinoresinol from coniferyl alcohol monomers. Recently, a second, enantiocomplementary dirigent protein was identified in Arabidopsis thaliana, which directs enantioselective synthesis of (-)-pinoresinol.

Reaction of monolignol radicals in the presence of dirigent protein to form (+)-pinoresinol

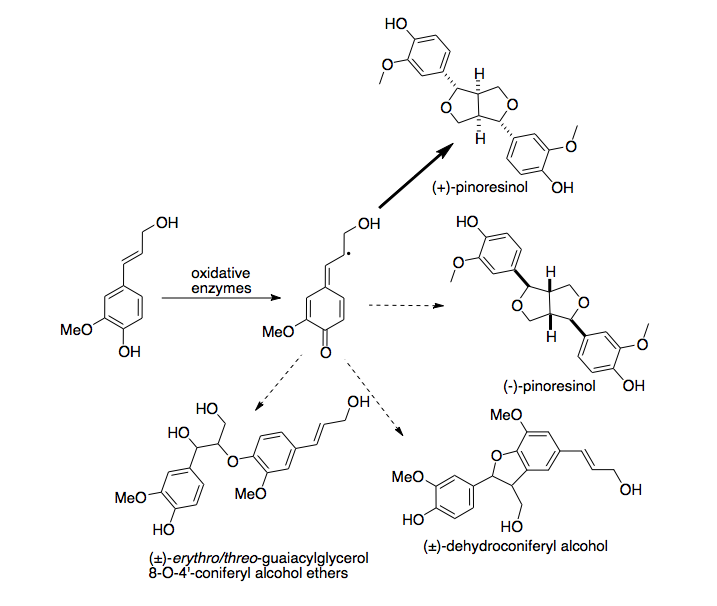
In the presence of dirigent protein from Forsythia intermedia, production of (+)-pinoresinol is greatly enriched while production of other products of dimerization is inhibited.

== Pharmacology ==
Pinoresinol inhibits the enzyme α-glucosidase in vitro and may therefore act as a hypoglycemic agent. A study involving extra virgin olive oil showed that pinoresinol possess in vitro chemoprevention properties. Increased apoptosis and cellular arrest at the G2/M stage in p53-proficient cells occurred. Pinoresinol of olive oil decreases vitamin D intestinal absorption.

== Metabolism into enterolignans ==
Pinoresinol, along with other plant lignans, are converted into enterolignans by intestinal microflora in the human body.

== See also ==
- List of phytochemicals in food
