= Cabbage white =

Cabbage white or cabbage butterfly may refer to:

- Pieris brassicae, or large white, a Palearctic butterfly
- Pieris rapae, or small white, a Palearctic butterfly that has been introduced to many other parts of the world
