= Chromobacteriosis infection =

- Specialty: Dermatology

Chromobacteriosis infections are a cutaneous condition caused by chromobacteria characterized by fluctuating abscesses.

== See also ==
- Aeromonas infection
- Skin lesion
