= Coniferyl alcohol =

- Coniferyl alcohol

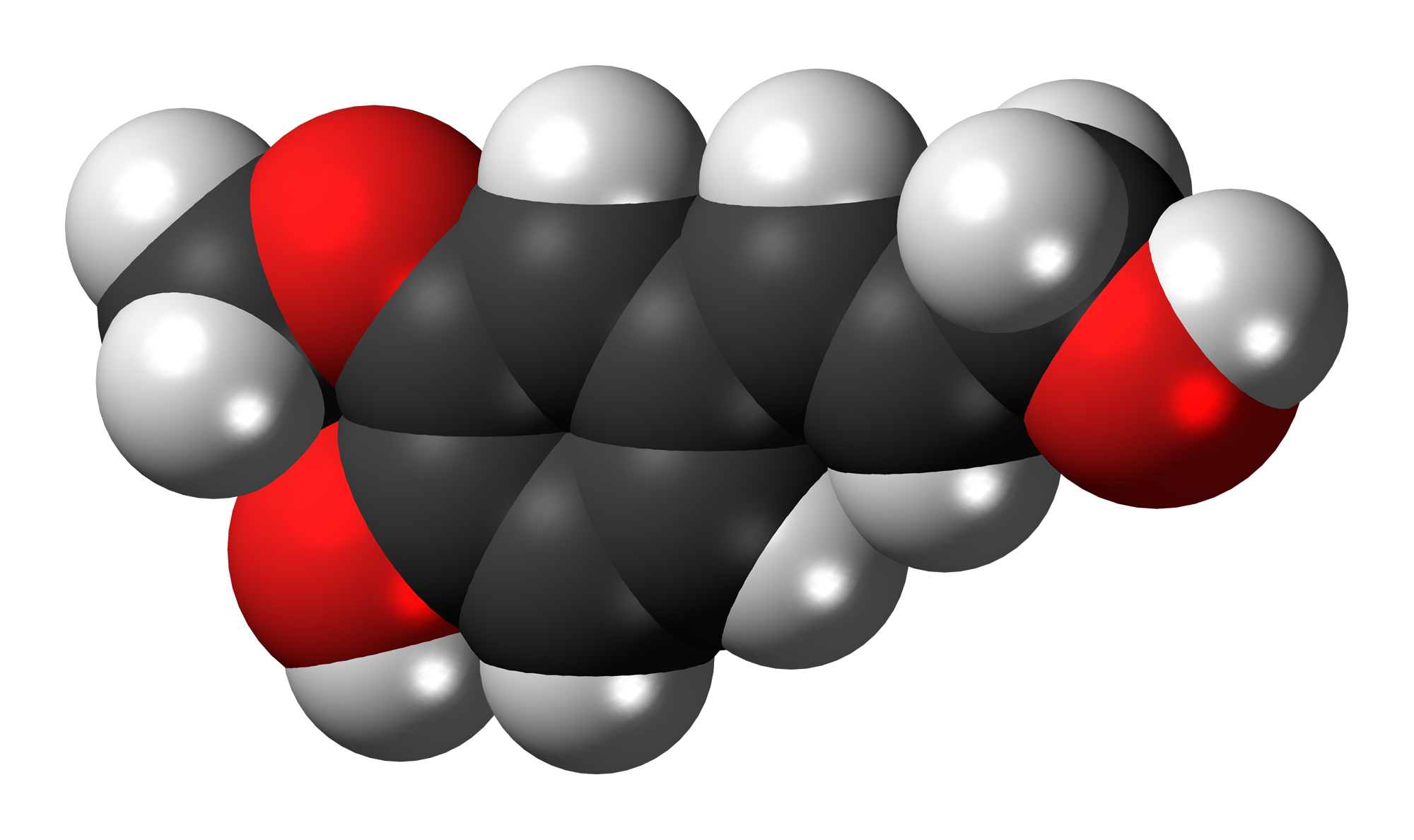

Names
- Preferred IUPAC name 4-[(1E)-3-Hydroxyprop-1-en-1-yl]-2-methoxyphenol
- Other names 4-hydroxy-3-methoxycinnamyl alcohol Coniferol

Identifiers
CAS Number	458-35-5
3D model (JSmol)	Interactive image
Beilstein Reference	2048963
ChEBI	CHEBI:17745
ChEMBL	ChEMBL501870
ChemSpider	1266063
ECHA InfoCard	100.260.977
EC Number	207-277-9
KEGG	C00590
PubChem CID	1549095
UNII	E7SM92591P
CompTox Dashboard (EPA)	DTXSID50186489
- InChI: InChI=1S/C10H12O3/c1-13-10-7-8(3-2-6-11)4-5-9(10)12/h2-5,7,11-12H,6H2,1H3/b3-2+ Key: JMFRWRFFLBVWSI-NSCUHMNNSA-N; InChI=1/C10H12O3/c1-13-10-7-8(3-2-6-11)4-5-9(10)12/h2-5,7,11-12H,6H2,1H3/b3-2+ Key: JMFRWRFFLBVWSI-NSCUHMNNBF
- SMILES: Oc1ccc(cc1OC)/C=C/CO

Properties
Chemical formula	C_{10}H_{12}O_{3}
Molar mass	180.203 g·mol^{−1}
Melting point	74 °C (165 °F; 347 K)
Boiling point	163 to 165 °C (325 to 329 °F; 436 to 438 K)

Hazards
- GHS labelling
Pictograms	(GHS07: Exclamation mark)
Signal word	Warning
Hazard statements	H315, H319, H335
Precautionary statements	P261, P264, P271, P280, P302+P352, P304+P340, P305+P351+P338, P312, P321, P332+P313, P337+P313, P362, P403+P233, P405, P501
- Except where otherwise noted, data are given for materials in their standard state (at 25 °C [77 °F], 100 kPa). verify (what is ?) Infobox references

Coniferyl alcohol is an organic compound with the formula HO(CH_{3}O)C_{6}H_{3}CH=CHCH_{2}OH. A colourless or white solid, it is one of the monolignols, produced via the phenylpropanoid biochemical pathway. When copolymerized with related aromatic compounds, coniferyl alcohol forms lignin or lignans. Coniferin is a glucoside of coniferyl alcohol. Coniferyl alcohol is an intermediate in biosynthesis of eugenol and of stilbenoids and coumarin. Gum benzoin contains significant amount of coniferyl alcohol and its esters. It is found in both gymnosperm and angiosperm plants. Sinapyl alcohol and paracoumaryl alcohol, the other two lignin monomers, are found in angiosperm plants and grasses.

== Occurrence ==
Coniferyl alcohol is produced from coniferyl aldehyde by the action of dehydrogenase enzymes.

It is a queen retinue pheromone (QRP), a type of honey bee pheromone found in the mandibular glands.

In Forsythia intermedia a dirigent protein was found to direct the stereoselective biosynthesis of (+)-pinoresinol from coniferyl alcohol. Recently, a second, enantiocomplementary dirigent protein was identified in Arabidopsis thaliana, which directs enantioselective synthesis of (−)-pinoresinol.
