= Sesamol =

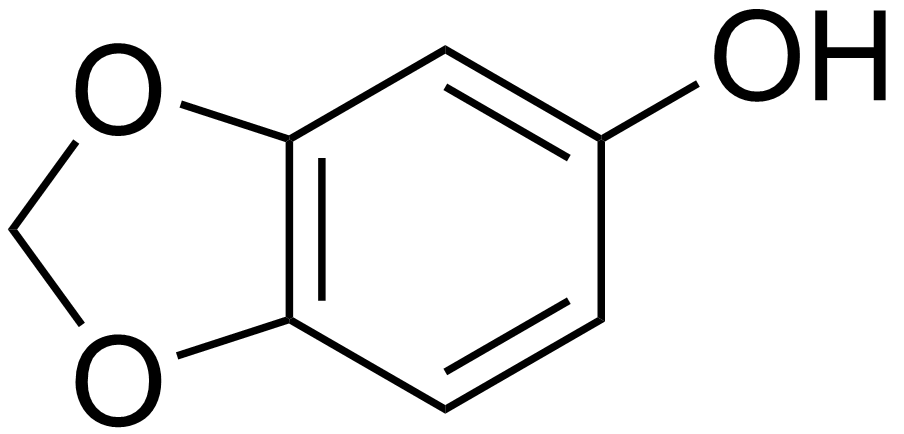
- Chemical structure of sesamol

Names
- Preferred IUPAC name 2H-1,3-Benzodioxol-5-ol
- Other names 1,3-Benzodioxol-5-ol; Benzo[d][1,3]dioxol-5-ol; Sesamol; 3,4-Methylenedioxyphenol

Identifiers
CAS Number	533-31-3
3D model (JSmol)	Interactive image
ChemSpider	61586
ECHA InfoCard	100.007.784
KEGG	C10832
PubChem CID	68289
UNII	94IEA0NV89
CompTox Dashboard (EPA)	DTXSID9021267
- InChI: InChI=1S/C7H6O3/c8-5-1-2-6-7(3-5)10-4-9-6/h1-3,8H,4H2 Key: LUSZGTFNYDARNI-UHFFFAOYSA-N; InChI=1/C7H6O3/c8-5-1-2-6-7(3-5)10-4-9-6/h1-3,8H,4H2 Key: LUSZGTFNYDARNI-UHFFFAOYAT
- SMILES: O1c2ccc(O)cc2OC1

Properties
Chemical formula	C_{7}H_{6}O_{3}
Molar mass	138.12 g/mol
Melting point	62 to 65 °C (144 to 149 °F; 335 to 338 K)
Boiling point	121 to 127 °C (250 to 261 °F; 394 to 400 K) at 5 mmHg

Hazards
NFPA 704 (fire diamond)	1 1 0
- Except where otherwise noted, data are given for materials in their standard state (at 25 °C [77 °F], 100 kPa). verify (what is ?) Infobox references

Sesamol is a natural organic compound which is a component of sesame seeds and sesame oil, with anti-inflammatory, antioxidant, antidepressant and neuroprotective properties. It is a white crystalline solid that is a derivative of phenol. It is sparingly soluble in water, but miscible with most oils. It can be produced by organic synthesis from heliotropine.

Sesamol has been found to be an antioxidant that may prevent the spoilage of oils. It also may prevent the spoilage of oils by acting as an antifungal. It can be used in the synthesis of paroxetine.

Sesamol's molecular targets and mechanism of action, at least for its antidepressant-like effects, is found to be through the brain nerve growth factor (NGF) and endocannabinoid signalling under the regulatory drive of the CB1 receptors.

Alexander Shulgin used sesamol in his book PiHKAL to make MMDA-2.

== See also ==
- Sesamin and sesamolin, two lignans found in sesame oil
- Sesamex, a derivative used as an adjuvant for pesticides
