= Sesame allergy =

Food allergy caused by sesame seeds

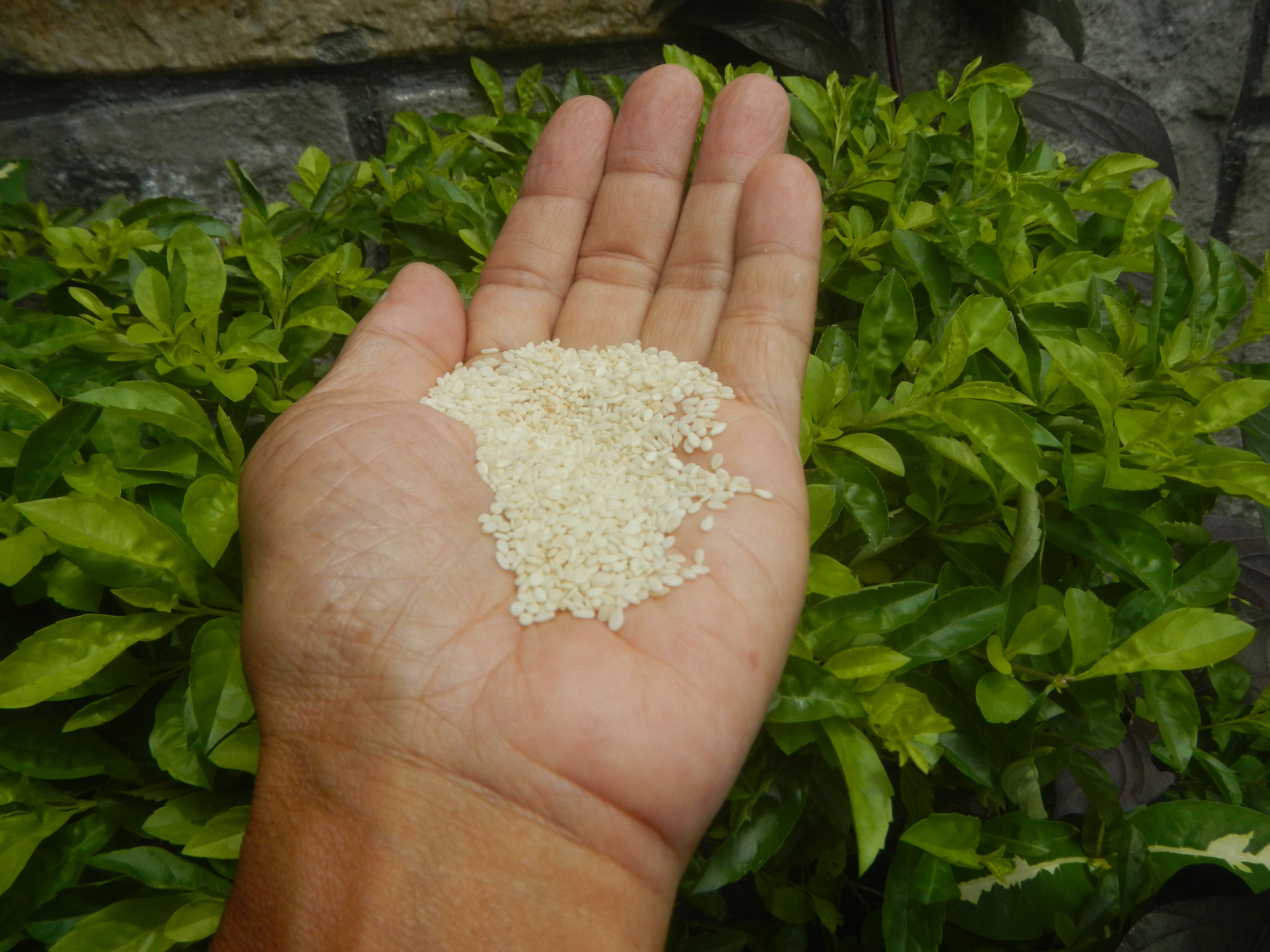
- Raw sesame seeds with sesame plants in background
- Pronunciation: sesəmi ælə(r)dʒi
- Specialty: Emergency medicine Allergy & immunology
- Symptoms: itchiness, rash, swelling of lips, tongue or the whole face, eczema, wheezing and shortness of breath, nausea, vomiting, abdominal pain, diarrhea, anaphylaxis
- Causes: Type I hypersensitivity
- Risk factors: Childhood in Middle East, where sesame is a traditional food, and increasingly in developed countries
- Diagnostic method: Medical history and standard allergy tests
- Differential diagnosis: Peanut allergy, Tree nut allergy
- Prevention: Introduction to allergenic foods during infancy
- Treatment: Epinephrine; Antihistamines (mild)
- Prognosis: 70% to 80% persist into adulthood
- Frequency: 0.1–0.2% (higher in Middle East countries)

A food allergy to sesame (Sesamum indicum) seeds has prevalence estimates in the range of 0.1–0.2% of the general population, and are higher in the Middle East and other countries where sesame seeds are used in traditional foods. Reporting of sesame seed allergy has increased in the 21st century, either due to a true increase from exposure to more sesame foods or due to an increase in awareness. Increasing sesame allergy rates have induced more countries to regulate food labels to identify sesame ingredients in products and the potential for allergy. In the United States, sesame became the ninth food allergen with mandatory labeling, effective 1 January 2023.

The allergic reaction is an immune hypersensitivity to proteins and lipophilic proteins in sesame seeds and foods made with sesame seeds, including food-grade sesame oil. Symptoms can be either rapid or gradual in onset, occurring over minutes to days. Rapid allergic reaction may include anaphylaxis, a potentially life-threatening condition requiring treatment with epinephrine. Other, slower presentations may include atopic dermatitis or inflammation of the esophagus. For food labeling requirements established in many countries, sesame labeling is required in addition to the eight most common food allergens, responsible for 90% of allergic reactions to foods: cow's milk, eggs, wheat, shellfish, peanuts, tree nuts, fish, and soy beans.

In addition to water-soluble allergenic proteins, sesame seeds share with peanuts and hazelnuts a class of allergenic proteins known as oleosins. Commercially prepared sesame extracts lack these lipophilic proteins, and so can be the reason for false negative skin prick test results even though the oleosins can be responsible for a range of allergic reactions, including anaphylactic shock. Unlike early childhood allergic reactions to milk and eggs, which often lessen as children age, sesame allergy persists into older childhood and adulthood; an estimated 20–30% of affected people develop tolerance. Strong predictors for adult-persistence are anaphylaxis, high sesame-specific serum immunoglobulin E (IgE) and robust response to the skin prick test. Sesame allergy can be cross-reactive with allergy to peanuts, hazelnuts, and almonds.

== Signs and symptoms ==
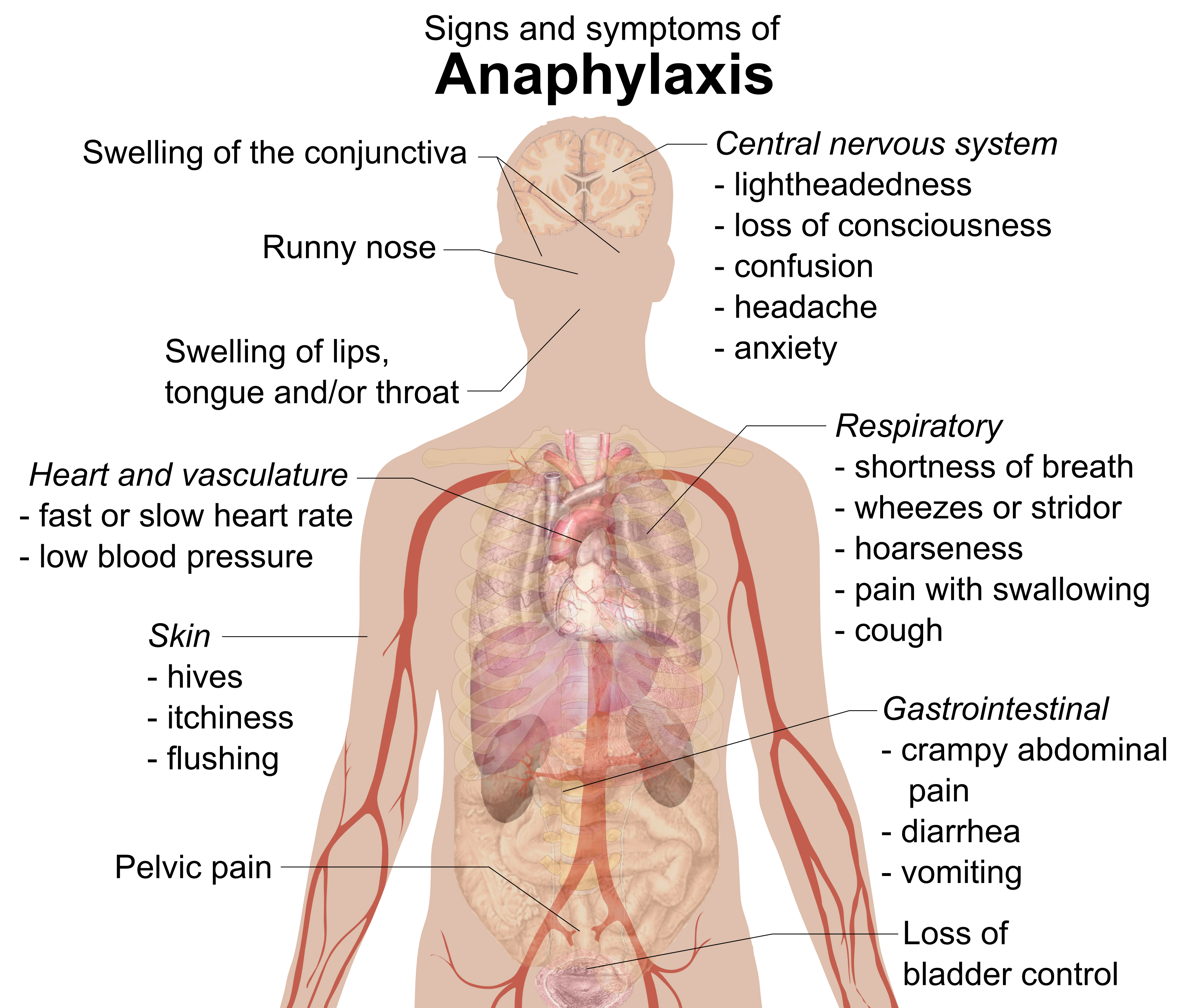
Signs and symptoms of anaphylaxis

Food allergies in general usually have an onset of symptoms in the range of minutes to hours for an IgE-mediated response, which may include anaphylaxis. Symptoms may include rash, hives, itching of mouth, lips, tongue, throat, eyes, skin, or other areas, swelling of lips, tongue, eyelids, or the whole face, difficulty swallowing, runny or congested nose, hoarse voice, wheezing, shortness of breath, diarrhea, abdominal pain, lightheadedness, fainting, nausea, or vomiting. Non-IgE-mediated responses occur hours to days after consuming the allergenic food, and are not as severe as IgE-mediated symptoms. Symptoms of allergies vary from person to person and incident to incident.

Potentially life-threatening, the anaphylactic onset of an allergic reaction is characterized by respiratory distress, as indicated by wheezing, breathing difficulty, and cyanosis, and also circulatory impairment that can include a weak pulse, pale skin, and fainting. This can occur when IgE antibodies are released and areas of the body not in direct contact with the food allergen show severe symptoms. Untreated, the overall response can lead to vasodilation, which can be a low blood pressure situation called anaphylactic shock. All of these symptoms have been described as potentially a result of sesame allergy.

== Causes ==
=== Eating sesame ===
Sesame allergy typically results from the eating of foods containing sesame seeds, sesame flour or sesame seed oil. The immune system overreacts to proteins found in sesame-containing foods, initiating the allergic reaction. Once an allergic reaction has occurred, it remains a lifelong sensitivity for 70–80% of people.

=== Cross-contact ===
Cross-contact exposure, also referred to as cross-contamination, occurs as a result of foods being processed in factories or at food markets, or are being prepared for cooking in restaurants and home kitchens. The allergenic proteins are inadvertently transferred from one food to another. Bakeries can be sites of cross-contact exposure because sesame seeds are used as ingredients in various baked goods. Assessment of food products purchased from Middle Eastern grocery stores and bakeries in Montreal, Canada, found that 16% of packaged products with Precautionary Allergen Labelling may contain sesame. This finding indicates that products can have measurable sesame content, causing inadvertent cross-contamination.

=== Occupational exposure ===
Exposure to inhaled sesame dust by bakery workers has resulted in sesame allergy in an occupational setting.

=== Cross-reactivity to other plant foods ===
The 2S albumin proteins in sesame seeds partially share amino acid sequence and structure with 2S albumin proteins from other plants. These are likely the proteins responsible for cross-reactive allergic reactions to peanuts, almonds, and hazelnuts. Allergic reactions to oleosins from hazelnut and peanut oils have been confirmed as cross-reactive to sesame oil. Protein analysis suggests allergy to chia seeds may cross-react with sesame allergy.

== Mechanisms ==
=== Allergic response ===
Causes of food allergies can result from three mechanisms of the allergic response:

1. IgE-mediated (classic) – the most common type, manifest as acute changes that occur within minutes to an hour or two after eating, and may progress to anaphylaxis
2. Non-IgE mediated – characterized by an immune response not involving immunoglobulin E; may occur hours to days after eating
3. IgE and non-IgE-mediated – a hybrid of the above two types

Allergic reactions are hyperactive responses of the immune system to substances that are innocuous to the majority of the population, such as food proteins. Why some proteins trigger allergic reactions while others do not is not entirely clear. One theory holds that proteins which resist digestion in the stomach, therefore reaching the small intestine relatively intact, are more likely to be allergenic. Some studies have shown that digestion may abolish, decrease, have no effect, or even increase the allergenicity of food allergens. The heat of cooking structurally degrades protein molecules, potentially making them less allergenic.

In the early stages of acute allergic reaction, lymphocytes previously sensitized to a specific sesame protein or protein fraction react by quickly producing a particular type of antibody known as secreted IgE (sIgE). This type of antibody circulates in the blood and binds to IgE-specific receptors on the surface of other kinds of immune cells called mast cells and basophils. Both of these are involved in the acute inflammatory response. Activated mast cells and basophils undergo a process called degranulation, during which they release histamine and other inflammatory chemical mediators called (cytokines, interleukins, leukotrienes, and prostaglandins) into the surrounding tissue. These mediators on release cause several systemic effects, such as vasodilation, mucous secretion, nerve stimulation, and smooth-muscle contraction. This results in runny nose, itchiness, shortness of breath, and potentially anaphylaxis. Depending on the individual, the allergen, and the mode of introduction, the symptoms can be systemic (classical anaphylaxis), or localized to particular body systems; asthma is localized to the respiratory system while hives and eczema are localized to the skin.

After the chemical mediators of the acute response subside, late-phase responses can often occur due to the migration of other white blood cells such as neutrophils, lymphocytes, eosinophils, and macrophages to the initial reaction sites. This is usually seen 2–24 hours after the original reaction. Cytokines from mast cells may also play a role in the persistence of long-term effects. Late-phase responses seen in asthma are slightly different from those seen in other allergic responses, although they are still caused by release of mediators from eosinophils.

=== Allergenic proteins ===
Eight sesame seed allergens have been characterized (Ses i 1 to Ses i 8). Ses i 1 and Ses i 2 are of the biochemical type 2S albumins; these partially share amino acid sequence and structure with 2S albumins from other plants, and are likely the proteins responsible for cross-reactive allergic reactions to peanuts and certain tree nuts, specifically almonds and hazelnuts. Ses i 3 is a vicilin-like globulin. Ses i 4 and Ses i 5 are oleosins, associated with oil bodies, which appear to contribute to cross-reactivity to hazelnut and peanut oils. Ses i 6 and Ses i 7 are globulins. Ses i 8 is a profilin.

Allergic reactions to oleosins from sesame, hazelnut and peanut oils have been confirmed, ranging from contact dermatitis to anaphylactic shock. The sesame oil body associated proteins are at ~17 and ~15 kDa, named, respectively, Ses i 4 and Ses i 5. Standardized sesame extracts used for allergy diagnosis do not contain oleosins, so the results of skin prick tests can present a false negative whereas using freshly ground seeds elicits a true positive. Commercial-grade peanut oil is highly refined, so the oleosins are removed, but commercial-grade sesame oil intended for food consumption is typically an unrefined product with a measurable protein content.

== Diagnosis ==
Diagnosis is usually based on a medical history, elimination diet, skin prick test, blood tests for food-specific IgE antibodies or oral food challenge. Skin prick tests sometimes give false negatives due to the lack of oleosin proteins in standardized sesame extracts. Freshly ground sesame seeds can thereby be preferable for skin prick tests. Confirmation is by double-blind, placebo-controlled food challenges, which remains the diagnostic gold standard for sesame allergy. Self-reported sesame allergy often fails to be confirmed by food challenge.

== Prevention ==
Reviews of food allergens in general stated that introducing solid foods to infants at ages 4–6 months may result in the lowest subsequent allergy risks for eczema, allergic rhinitis and more severe reactions, with the best evidence for peanuts and chicken eggs. As of March 2022, one clinical trial attempted to determine whether introducing sesame to the diets of infants early or delaying until older would affect the risk of subsequent allergy, but there were too few confirmed subsequent sesame allergy subjects in the test or control groups to conduct a statistical analysis.

=== Foods to avoid ===
A wide variety of foods may contain whole sesame seeds, seeds ground to sesame flour, and/or sesame oil. Food-grade sesame oil typically contains protein content sufficient to trigger allergic reactions. Traditional food recipes from the Middle East and Asia, including tahini, baklava, hummus, baba ghanoush and halva, plus granola-type food bars, frequently contain sesame. Baked goods such as bagels may have whole sesame seeds as topping. In Japan, hard candies and snack bars often contain whole sesame seeds. People with a known sesame allergy are advised to make that information clear to staff when dining at restaurants. In addition, cosmetics, dietary supplements and drug products may contain sesame oil, although the last tends to use purified sesame oil unlikely to contain protein content sufficient to cause allergic reactions.

== Treatment ==
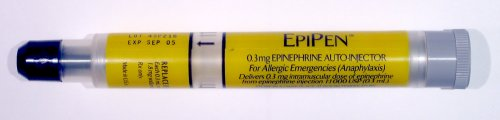
Epinephrine autoinjectors are portable single-dose epinephrine-dispensing devices used to treat anaphylaxis.

Treatment for ingestion of sesame products by allergic individuals varies depending on the severity of symptoms. For less severe symptoms, an antihistamine such as diphenhydramine may be prescribed. Sometimes prednisone will be prescribed to prevent a possible late phase Type I hypersensitivity reaction. Severe allergic reactions (anaphylaxis) may require treatment with an epinephrine pen, which is an injection device designed to be used by a non-healthcare professional when emergency treatment is warranted. Unlike for egg allergy, for which there is active research on trying oral immunotherapy (OIT) to desensitize people to egg allergens, oral immunotherapy for sesame allergy has not yet reached the quality of evidence sufficient to justify its use as a medical treatment.

== Prognosis ==
Unlike milk and egg allergies, for which more than half disappear by teenage years, 70–80% of sesame allergy cases persist into adulthood. Strong predictors for adult-persistence are anaphylaxis, high sesame-specific serum IgE and robust response to the skin prick test. Survey results reported in one study stated that for individuals with confirmed IgE-mediated sesame allergy, an estimated one-third has previously experienced a severe allergic reaction to sesame necessitating use of epinephrine as treatment.

== Epidemiology ==
Incidence and prevalence are terms commonly used in describing disease epidemiology. Incidence is newly diagnosed cases, which can be expressed as new cases per year per million people. Prevalence is the number of cases alive, expressible as existing cases per million people during a period of time. Sesame allergy prevalence is in the range of 0.1–0.2% in the US and western Europe, and confirmed as high as 0.8–0.9% in the Middle East and other countries where sesame seeds are used in traditional foods. Reporting of sesame seed allergy has increased over recent decades, either a true increase due to exposure from more foods or an increase in awareness. Self-reported allergy prevalence is always higher than food-challenge confirmed allergy. One review of a large survey conducted in the US reported 0.49% for the former and 0.23% for the latter.

== Regulation ==
Whether food allergy prevalence is increasing or not, food allergy awareness has increased, with impacts on the quality of life for children, their parents and their immediate caregivers. In the United States, the Food Allergen Labeling and Consumer Protection Act (FALCPA) of 2004 causes people to be reminded of allergy problems every time they handle a food package. Although not regulated under FALCPA, some restaurants have added allergen warnings to menus. The Culinary Institute of America, a premier school for chef training, offers courses in allergen-free cooking and a separate teaching kitchen. Some school systems have protocols about what foods can be brought into the school. Despite all these precautions, people with serious allergies are aware that accidental exposure can easily occur at other people's houses, at schools or in restaurants.

=== Regulation of labeling ===
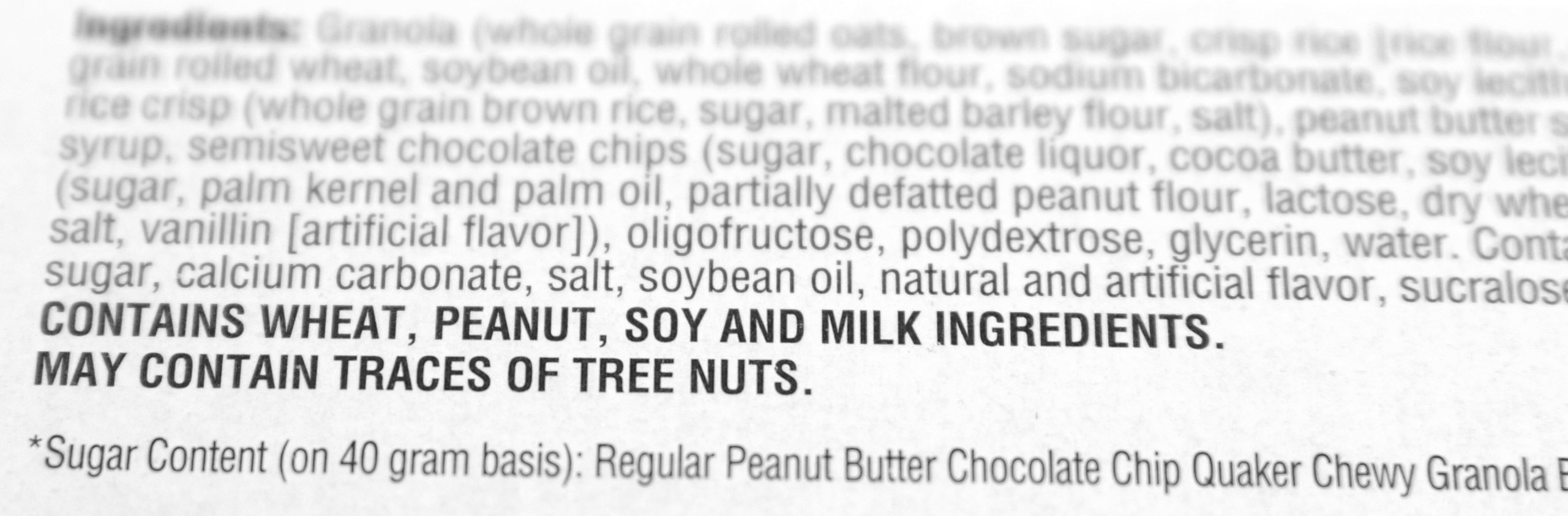
An example of "MAY CONTAIN TRACES OF..." as a means of listing trace amounts of allergens in a food product due to cross-contamination during manufacture

In response to the risk that certain foods pose to those with food allergies, some countries have responded by instituting labeling laws that require food products to clearly inform consumers if their products contain major allergens or if byproducts of major allergens are among the ingredients intentionally added to foods. Laws and regulations passed in the United States and by the European Union recommend labeling but do not mandate declaration of the presence of trace amounts in the final product as a consequence of unintentional cross-contamination.

==== Ingredients intentionally added (U.S.) ====
FALCPA became effective 1 January 2006, requiring companies selling foods in the United States to disclose on labels whether a packaged food product contains any of these eight major food allergens, added intentionally: cow's milk, peanuts, eggs, shellfish, fish, tree nuts, soy and wheat. In November 2020, the US Food and Drug Administration issued draft guidance recommending that food manufacturers add sesame-containing foods to labels, which would make sesame the ninth required allergy label requirement.

The "FASTER Act", stipulating that sesame labeling become mandatory, came into effect on 1 January 2023, making sesame the ninth required food ingredient label in the US. However, in response to this new law, national baked goods suppliers began adding sesame to their bread products that did not previously contain sesame so that they would not need to take any steps to prevent cross-contamination. In response to consumer outcry, restaurants such as Chick-Fil-A, Wendy's, and Olive Garden blamed their suppliers for the recipe change, stating "Chick-Fil-A sources bread from multiple suppliers. There are no national sesame-free bread suppliers that can consistently supply Chick-Fil-A's bread volumes" and "With this industry wide change, our bread suppliers are unable to prevent cross-contact of sesame due to shared production lines and have therefore reformulated to add a small amount of sesame flour to our white bun and multi-grain brioche bun"; some Wendy's suppliers "have elected to add sesame flour to our premium and value buns as well as our Homestyle French Toast Sticks"; and "Following the FDA's declaration of sesame as a major allergen, Olive Garden suppliers have added a minimal amount of sesame flour (less than 2%) to our breadsticks due to the potential for cross-contamination at the bakery", respectively. In October of 2023, Olive Garden announced it was switching suppliers and reinstating sesame-free breadsticks, stating "It was always our intent to identify alternative sources to ensure our breadsticks did not contain sesame flour."

==== Ingredients intentionally added (other than U.S.) ====
In addition to the eight major food allergens, Canada added sesame seeds and all foods made from or with sesame seeds, be declared on food labeling. In 2005, the European Union required listing for those eight major allergens plus molluscs, celery, mustard, lupin, sesame and sulfites. In Japan, regulations distinguish between required and recommended labeling. Sesame is among a list of foods for which labeling is recommended but not required.

== See also ==
- List of allergens (food and non-food)
