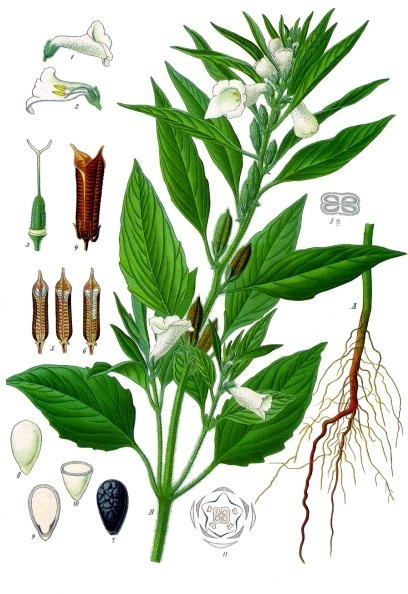
- Sesame plant

Scientific classification
- Kingdom: Plantae
- Clade: Tracheophytes
- Clade: Angiosperms
- Clade: Eudicots
- Clade: Asterids
- Order: Lamiales
- Family: Pedaliaceae
- Genus: Sesamum
- Species: S. indicum

Binomial name
- Sesamum indicum L.

Synonyms
- Dysosmon amoenum Raf.; Sesamum africanum Tod.; Sesamum occidentalis Heer & Regel; Sesamum oleiferum Sm.; Sesamum orientale L.; Volkameria orientalis (L.) Kuntze

= Sesame =

Plant cultivated for its edible seeds

Sesame (/ˈsɛsəmi/; Sesamum indicum) is a plant in the genus Sesamum, also called benne. Numerous wild relatives occur in Africa and a smaller number in India. It is widely naturalized in tropical regions around the world and is cultivated for its edible seeds, which grow in pods. World production in 2024 was 6.7 million tonnes (7.4 million short tons), with India, Myanmar, and Sudan as the largest producers.

Sesame seed is one of the oldest oilseed crops known, domesticated well over 3,000 years ago. Sesamum has many other species, most being wild and native to sub-Saharan Africa. S. indicum, the cultivated type, originated in India. It tolerates drought conditions well, growing where other crops fail. Sesame has one of the highest oil contents of any seed. With a rich, nutty flavor, it is a common ingredient in cuisines around the world. Sesame allergies are common relative to other foods.

== Description ==
Sesame is a perennial plant growing 50 to 100 cm (1 ft 8 in to 3 ft 3 in) tall, with opposite leaves 4 to 14 cm (2 to 6 in) long with an entire margin; they are broad lanceolate, to 5 cm (2.0 in) broad, at the base of the plant, narrowing to just 1 cm (0.39 in) broad on the flowering stem. The flowers are tubular, 2.5 to 3 cm (0.98 to 1.18 in) long. The flowers vary in colour, from white to pink or purple.

The fruit is a capsule, normally pubescent. The length of the fruit capsule varies from 2 to 3 cm (0.79 to 1.18 in), its width varies between 0.6 and 1.2 cm (0.24 and 0.47 in); there are four locules. The seeds are either white or black.

Sesame seeds are small. Their sizes vary widely by cultivar. Typically, the seeds are 3 to 4 mm (0.12 to 0.16 in). The seeds are ovate, slightly flattened, and somewhat thinner at the eye of the seed (hilum) than at the opposite end. The mass of 100 seeds sampled from a market in Ibadan, Nigeria is 0.203 grams (0.007 oz).

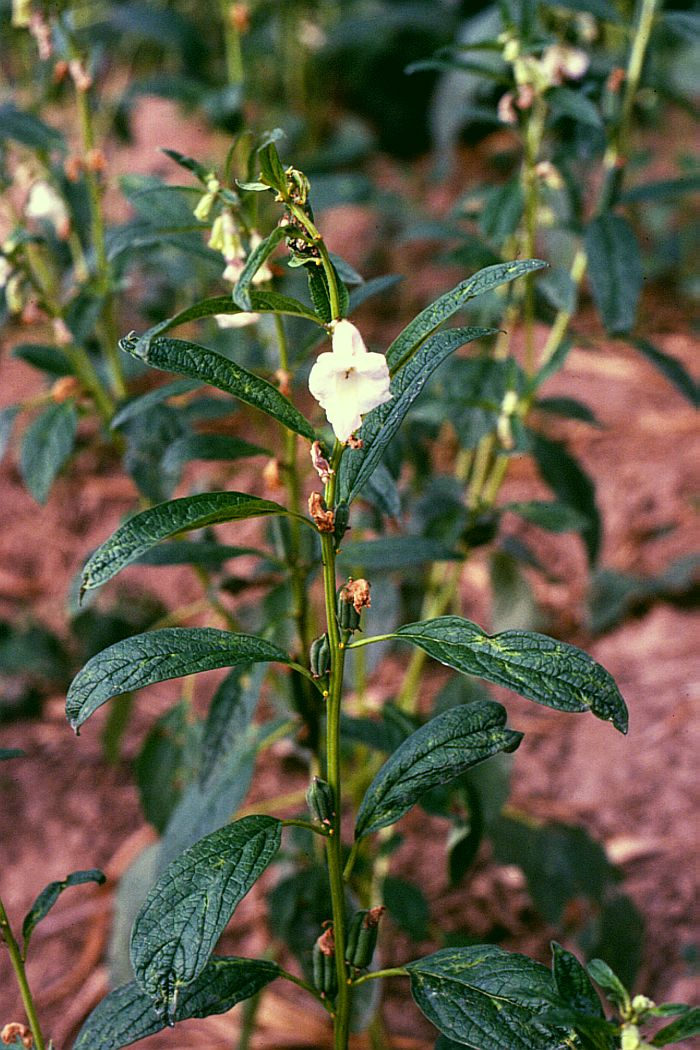
Plant

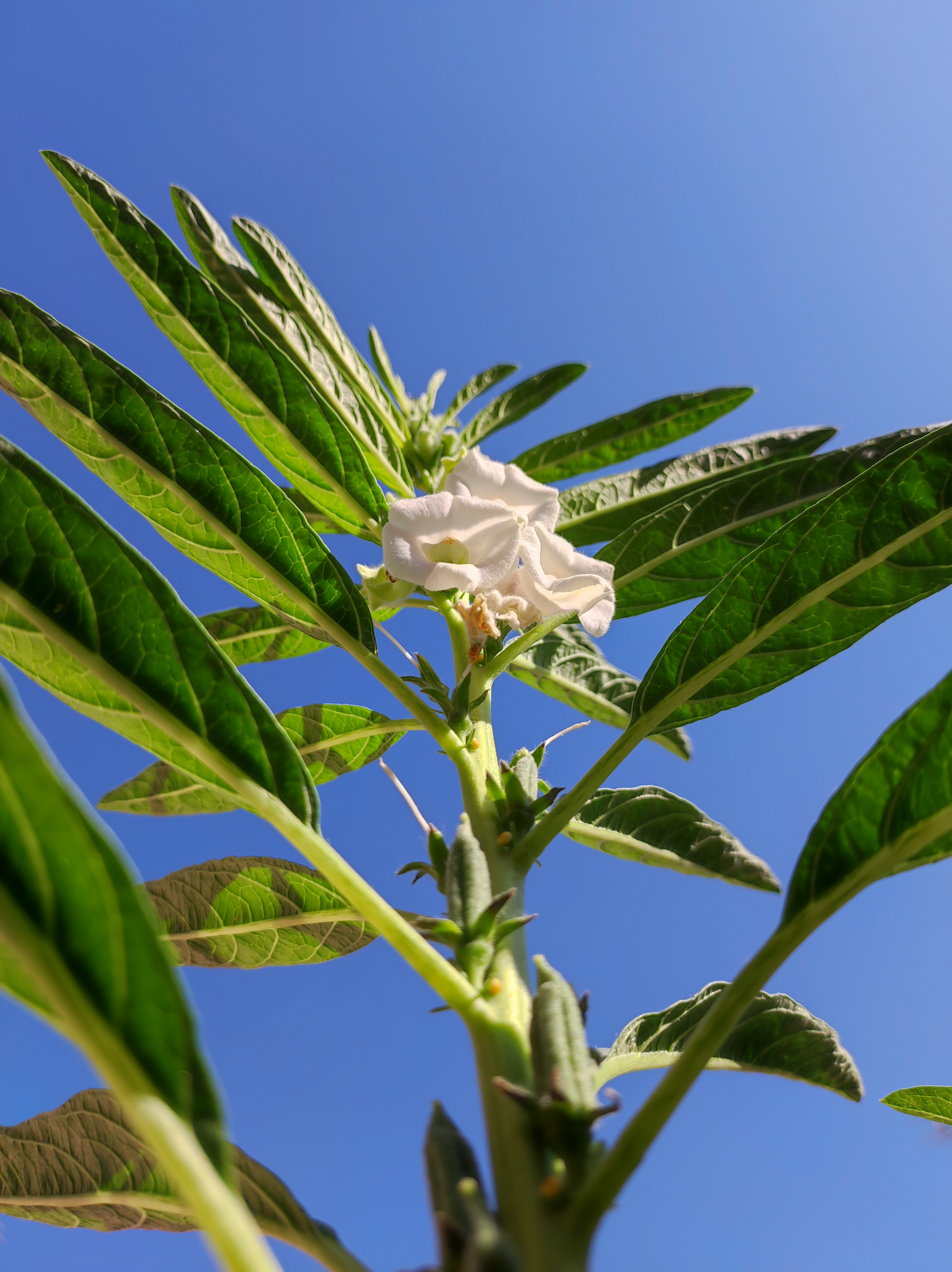
Flowers and seed capsules on plant

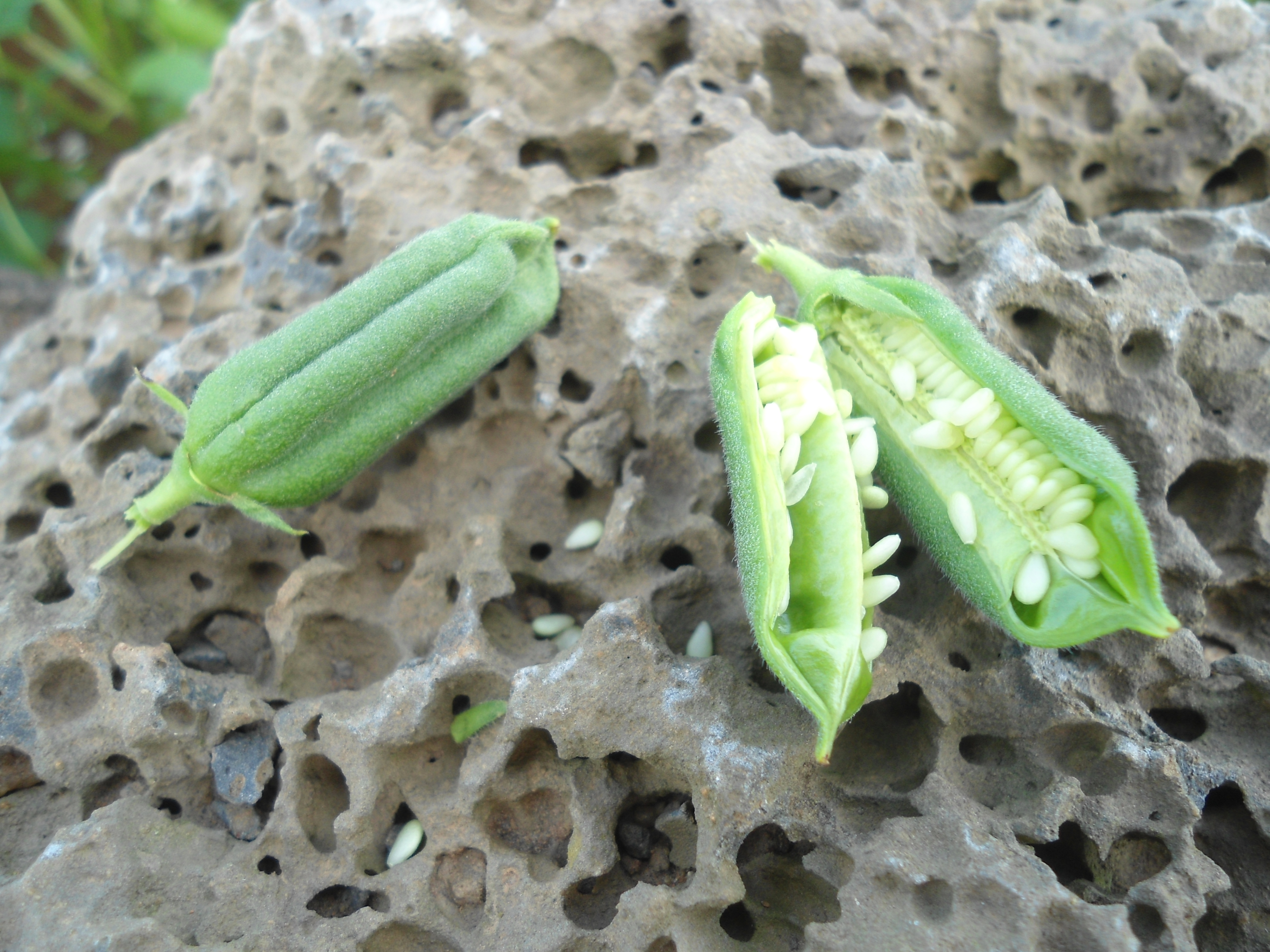
Seed capsule

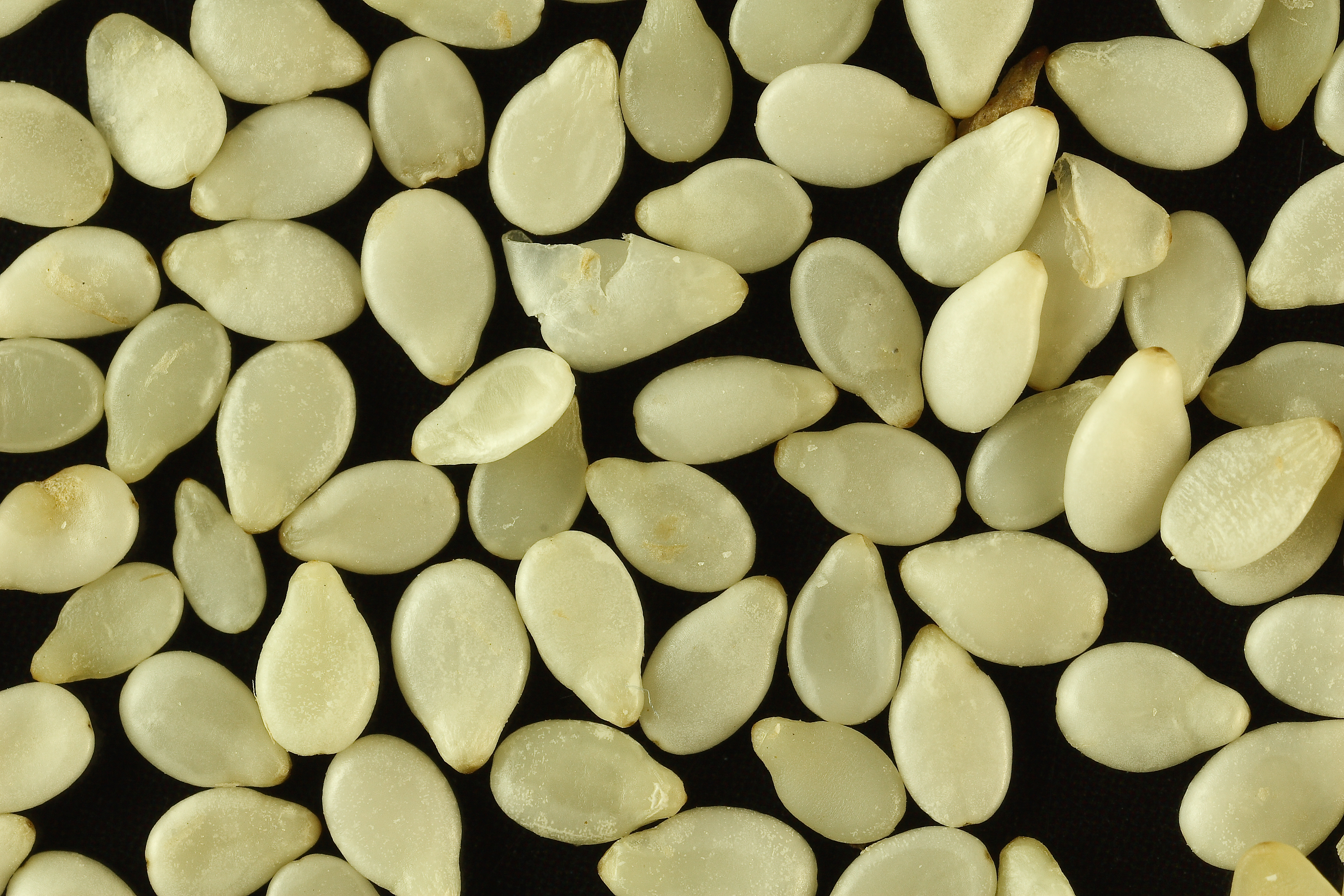
Magnified image of white sesame seeds

== Taxonomy ==
Sesame was described as the species Sesamum indicum by Carl Linnaeus in 1753.

=== Etymology ===
The word "sesame" is from Latin sesamum and Greek σήσαμον: sēsamon; which in turn are derived from ancient Semitic languages such as Akkadian šamaššamu. From these roots, words with the generalized meaning "oil, liquid fat" were derived.

The specific epithet indicum means of India.

The word "benne" was first recorded in English in 1769; it comes from the African American creole Gullah benne, which in turn derives from Malinke bĕne.

== Origins and history ==
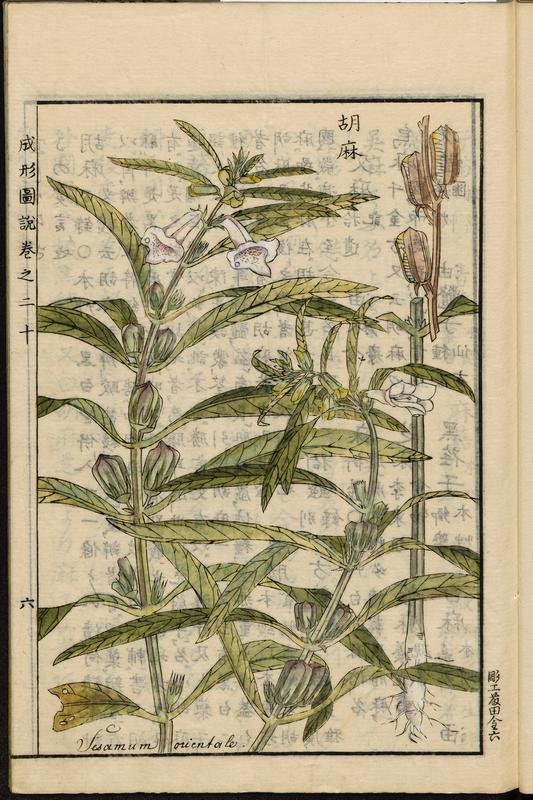
From the Seikei Zusetsu agriculture encyclopedia, 1804

Sesame seed is considered to be the oldest oilseed crop known to humanity. The genus has many species, and most are wild and native to sub-Saharan Africa. Sesamum indicum, the cultivated type, originated in India.

Archaeological remnants of charred sesame dating to about 3500–3050 BC shows that sesame was domesticated in the Indian subcontinent at least 5500 years ago. The archaeobotanist Dorian Q. Fuller states that trading of sesame between Mesopotamia and the Indian subcontinent occurred by 2000 BC. It is possible that the Indus Valley civilization exported sesame oil to Mesopotamia, where it was known as ilu in Sumerian and ellu in Akkadian, similar to the Dravidian languages Kannada and Malayalam eḷḷu, Tamil eḷ.

Sesame was cultivated in ancient Egypt. Egyptians called it sesemt, and it is included in the list of medicinal drugs in the scrolls of the c. 1550 BC Ebers Papyrus. Excavations of King Tutankhamen uncovered baskets of sesame among other grave goods, suggesting that sesame was present in Egypt by 1350 BC. Sesame was grown and pressed to extract oil at least 750 BC in the empire of Urartu. Others believe it may have originated in Ethiopia.

Historically, sesame was favored for its ability to grow in areas that do not support the growth of other crops. It is a robust crop that needs little farming support—it grows in drought conditions, in high heat, with residual moisture in soil after monsoons are gone or even when rains fail or when rains are excessive. It can be grown by subsistence farmers at the edge of deserts, earning it the name of survivor crop from the sesame breeder Derald Ray Langham.

In the early twentieth century, sesame oil was a compulsory ingredient of margarine in Europe, as its presence simplified the detection of margarine as an adulterant in butter, as well as being a suitable oil for making margarine. Around 1920, Burma exported about 197,400 tons of sesame oil per year.

== Agriculture ==
=== Cultivation ===
Sesame varieties have adapted to many soil types. The high-yielding crops do best on fertile, well-drained, soils with a neutral pH. However, these have a low tolerance for soils with high salt and water-logged conditions. Commercial sesame crops require 90 to 120 frost-free days. Warm conditions above 23 °C (73 °F) favor growth and yields. While sesame crops can grow in poor soils, the best yields come from properly fertilized farms.

Flowering depends on photoperiod and cultivar. The photoperiod also affects the seed's oil content: increased photoperiod increases oil content. The oil content of the seed is inversely proportional to its protein content. Sesame is drought-tolerant, in part due to its extensive root system. However, it requires adequate moisture for germination and early growth. While the crop survives drought and the presence of excess water, the yields are significantly lower in either condition. Moisture levels before planting and flowering affect yield the most. Most commercial cultivars of sesame are intolerant of waterlogging. Rainfall late in the season prolongs growth and increases loss to dehiscence, when the seedpod shatters, scattering the seed. Wind can also cause shattering at harvest.

=== Processing ===
Sesame seeds are protected by a capsule that bursts when the seeds are ripe. The time of this bursting, or "dehiscence", tends to vary, so farmers cut plants by hand and place them together in an upright position to continue ripening until all the capsules have opened. The 1943 discovery of an indehiscent mutant (analogous to nonshattering in cereals) led breeders to try to create a high-yield variety that does not drop its seeds. Despite some progress, dehiscence continues to limit production. Agronomists in Israel are working on modern cultivars of sesame that can be harvested by mechanical means.

Since sesame seed is small and flat, it is hard to dry after harvest because the seeds pack closely together, impeding the flow of air in a drying bin. Therefore, the harvested seeds need to be as dry as possible, and then stored at 6% moisture or less. Moist seed stores can rapidly heat up and become rancid.

=== Production ===
Sesame seed production 2024, tonnes
India	866,111
Myanmar	720,000
Sudan	626,173
Nigeria	450,000
Ethiopia	435,455
Burkina Faso	272,201
World	6,681,657
Source: FAOSTAT of the United Nations

In 2024, world production of sesame seeds was 6.7 million tonnes, led by India, Myanmar, and Sudan, which together accounted for 33% of the total (table). Along with Niger seed and soybeans, sesame seeds constitute approximately 20 percent of Ethiopia's export gains.

The white and other lighter-colored sesame seeds are common in Europe, the Americas, West Asia, and the Indian subcontinent. The black and darker-colored sesame seeds are mostly produced in China and Southeast Asia.

In the United States most sesame is raised by farmers under contract to Sesaco, which also supplies proprietary seed.

Sesame seed production

Sesame seed yield

=== Trade ===
Japan is the world's largest sesame importer. Sesame oil, particularly from roasted seed, is an important component of Japanese cooking and traditionally the principal use of the seed. China is the second-largest importer of sesame, mostly oil-grade. China exports lower-priced food-grade sesame seeds, particularly to Southeast Asia. Other major importers are the United States, Canada, the Netherlands, Turkey, and France.

Sesame seed is a high-value cash crop. Prices ranged between US$800 and 1,700 per tonne (810 and 1,730/long ton) between 2008 and 2010. Prices depend on perceived quality, based on factors such as the seed's appearance, freedom from impurities, oil content of at least 40%, and sorting by size and colour.

== Nutrition ==
=== Composition ===
Whole sesame seeds, dried
Nutritional value per 100 grams
- Energy: 2,400 kJ (570 kcal)
- Carbohydrates: 23.4
- Sugars: 0.3
- Dietary fiber: 11.8
- Fat: 49.7
- Saturated: 7.0
- Monounsaturated: 18.8
- Polyunsaturated: 21.8
- Protein: 17.7
Vitamins and minerals
Vitamins	Quantity %DV^{†}
Vitamin A	9 IU
Thiamine (B1)	66% 0.79 mg
Riboflavin (B2)	19% 0.25 mg
Niacin (B3)	28% 4.52 mg
Vitamin B6	46% 0.79 mg
Folate (B9)	24% 97 μg
Vitamin C	0% 0 mg
Vitamin E	2% 0.25 mg
Minerals	Quantity %DV^{†}
Calcium	75% 975 mg
Iron	81% 14.6 mg
Magnesium	84% 351 mg
Phosphorus	50% 629 mg
Potassium	16% 468 mg
Sodium	0% 11 mg
Zinc	71% 7.8 mg
- Other constituents: Quantity
- Water: 4.7 g
- Link to USDA FoodData Central entry
- ^{†}Percentages estimated using US recommendations for adults, except for potassium, which is estimated based on expert recommendation from the National Academies.

Dried whole sesame seeds are 5% water, 23% carbohydrates, 50% fat, and 18% protein (table). In a reference amount of 100 grams (3 1/2 ounces), dried sesame seeds supply 2,400 kilojoules (570 kilocalories) of food energy, and are a rich source (20% or more of the Daily Value, DV) of several B vitamins and dietary minerals, such as calcium, iron, and magnesium (all 75% or more of the DV, table).

The byproduct that remains after oil extraction from sesame seeds, also called sesame oil meal, is rich in protein (35–50%) and is used as feed for poultry and livestock.

As many seeds do, whole sesame seeds contain a significant amount of phytic acid, which is considered an antinutrient in that it binds to certain nutritional elements consumed at the same time, especially minerals, and prevents their absorption by carrying them along as they pass through the small intestine. Heating and cooking reduce the amount of the acid in the seeds. The seeds contain the lignans sesamolin, sesamin, pinoresinol, and lariciresinol.

=== Health effects ===
A meta-analysis showed that sesame consumption produced small reductions in both systolic and diastolic blood pressure; another demonstrated improvement in fasting blood glucose and hemoglobin A1c. Sesame oil studies reported a reduction of oxidative stress markers and lipid peroxidation.

== Possible harms ==
=== Allergy ===
Sesame can trigger the same allergic reactions, including anaphylaxis, as seen with other food allergens. A cross-reactivity exists between sesame and peanuts, hazelnuts and almonds. In addition to food products derived from sesame seeds, such as tahini and sesame oil, persons with sesame allergies are encouraged to be aware of foods that may contain sesame, such as baked goods. In addition to food sources, individuals allergic to sesame have been warned that a variety of non-food sources may also trigger a reaction to sesame, including cosmetics and skin-care products.

Prevalence of sesame allergy is on the order of 0.1–0.8% of the population according to studies and self-reports from Australia, Canada and the United States, but much higher in countries in the Middle East. In the United States, sesame allergy possibly affects 1.5 million individuals.

Canada requires sesame to be labelled as an allergen. In the European Union, identifying the presence of sesame, along with 13 other foods, either as an ingredient or an unintended contaminant in packaged food is compulsory. In the United States, the FASTER Act mandated labeling from 2023.

=== Contamination ===
Contamination by Salmonella, E.coli, pesticides, or other pathogens may occur in large batches of sesame seeds, such as in September 2020 when high levels of a common industrial compound, ethylene oxide, was found in a 250-tonne shipment of sesame seeds from India. After detection in Belgium, recalls for dozens of products and stores were issued across the European Union, totaling some 50 countries. Products with an organic certification were also affected by the contamination. Regular governmental food inspection for sesame contamination, as for Salmonella and E. coli in tahini, hummus or seeds, has found that poor hygiene practices during processing are common sources and routes of contamination.

== Culinary use ==
Yearly per capita supply of sesame seeds

Sesame seed is a common ingredient in many cuisines. Sesame seeds were brought into 17th-century colonial America by enslaved West Africans. The whole plant was used in West African cuisine. The seeds thickened soups and puddings, or were roasted and infused to produce a coffee-like drink. Oil from the seeds substituted for butter, and served as a shortening for cakes. The leaves on mature plants, which are rich in mucilage, can be used as a laxative as well as a treatment for dysentery and cholera. After arriving in North America, the plant was grown by slaves as a subsistence staple to supplement their weekly rations. In Caribbean cuisine, sugar and white sesame seeds are combined into a bar resembling peanut brittle and sold in stores and street corners, like Bahamian Benny cakes.

In Japan, whole seeds are found in many salads and baked snacks, and tan and black sesame seed varieties are roasted and used to make the flavouring gomashio. Ground black sesame and rice form zhimahu, a Chinese dessert and breakfast dish. The seeds and oil are used extensively in India, where sesame seeds mixed with heated jaggery, sugar, or palm sugar are made into balls and bars similar to peanut brittle or nut clusters and eaten as snacks, such as chikki.

Sesame is a common ingredient in Middle Eastern cuisine. The seeds are made into tahini paste and sweet halva. It is a common component of the Levantine spice mixture za'atar, popular throughout the Middle East.

In Southern Italian cuisine, traditional sesame seed confections are one of many culinary remnants of the Arabic period. These include a brittle-style torrone served at Christmas known as giurgiulena (from the Arabic juljulàn), and a lightly sweet, seed-covered biscuit called biscotti regina. Similar sweets are found in neighboring cultures throughout the Mediterranean.

Sesame oil is sometimes used for cooking, though not all varieties are suitable for high-temperature frying. The "toasted" form of the oil (as distinguished from the "cold-pressed" form) has a distinctive pleasant aroma and taste, and is sometimes used as a table condiment.

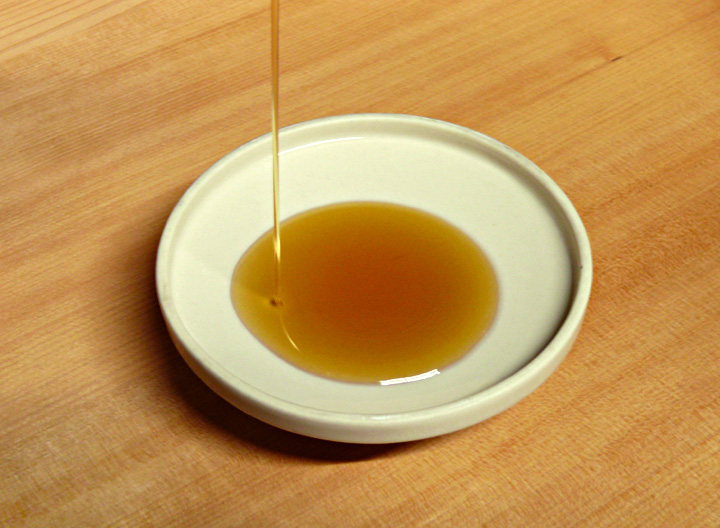
Sesame oil

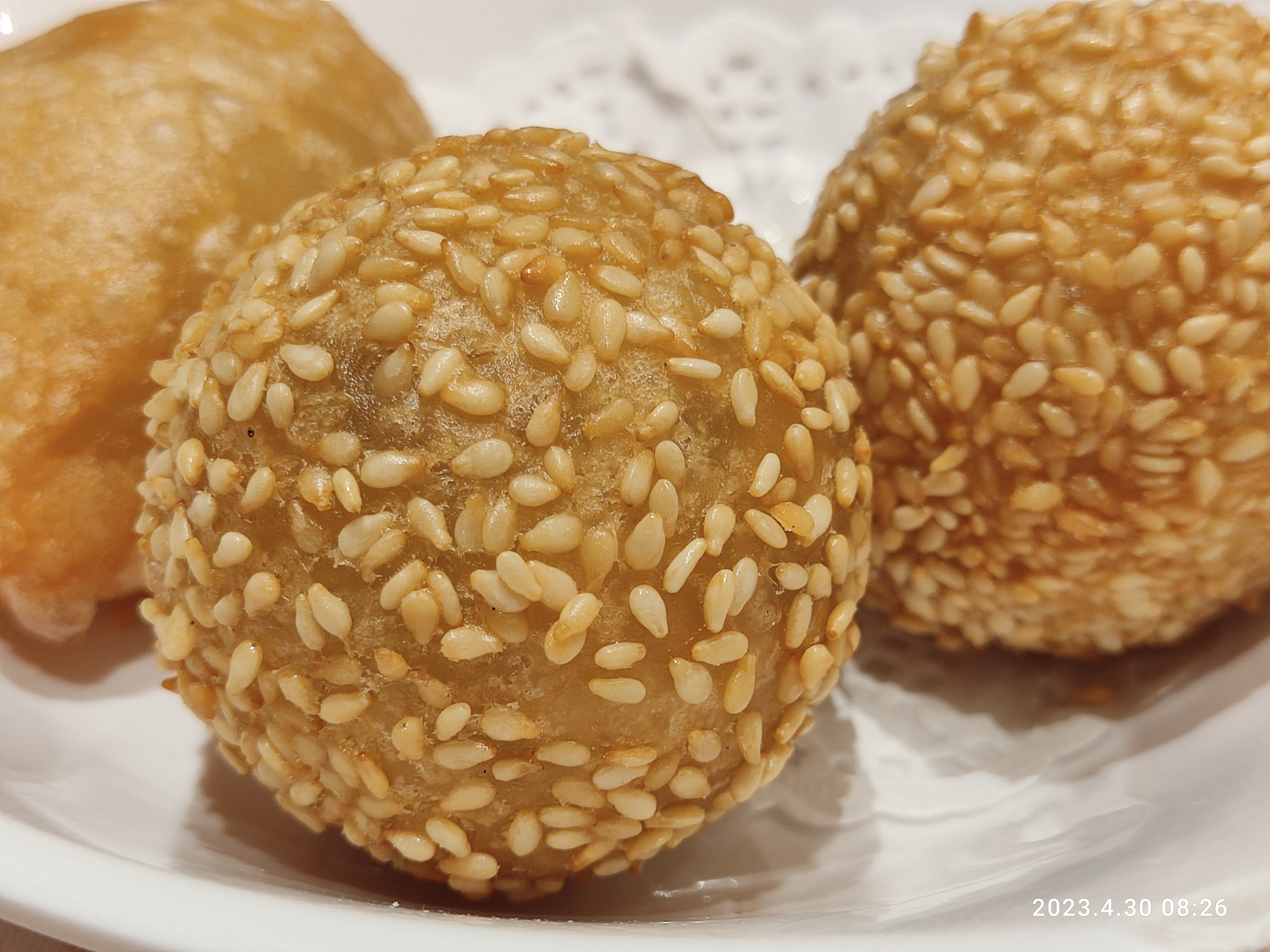
Jian dui covered with sesame seeds

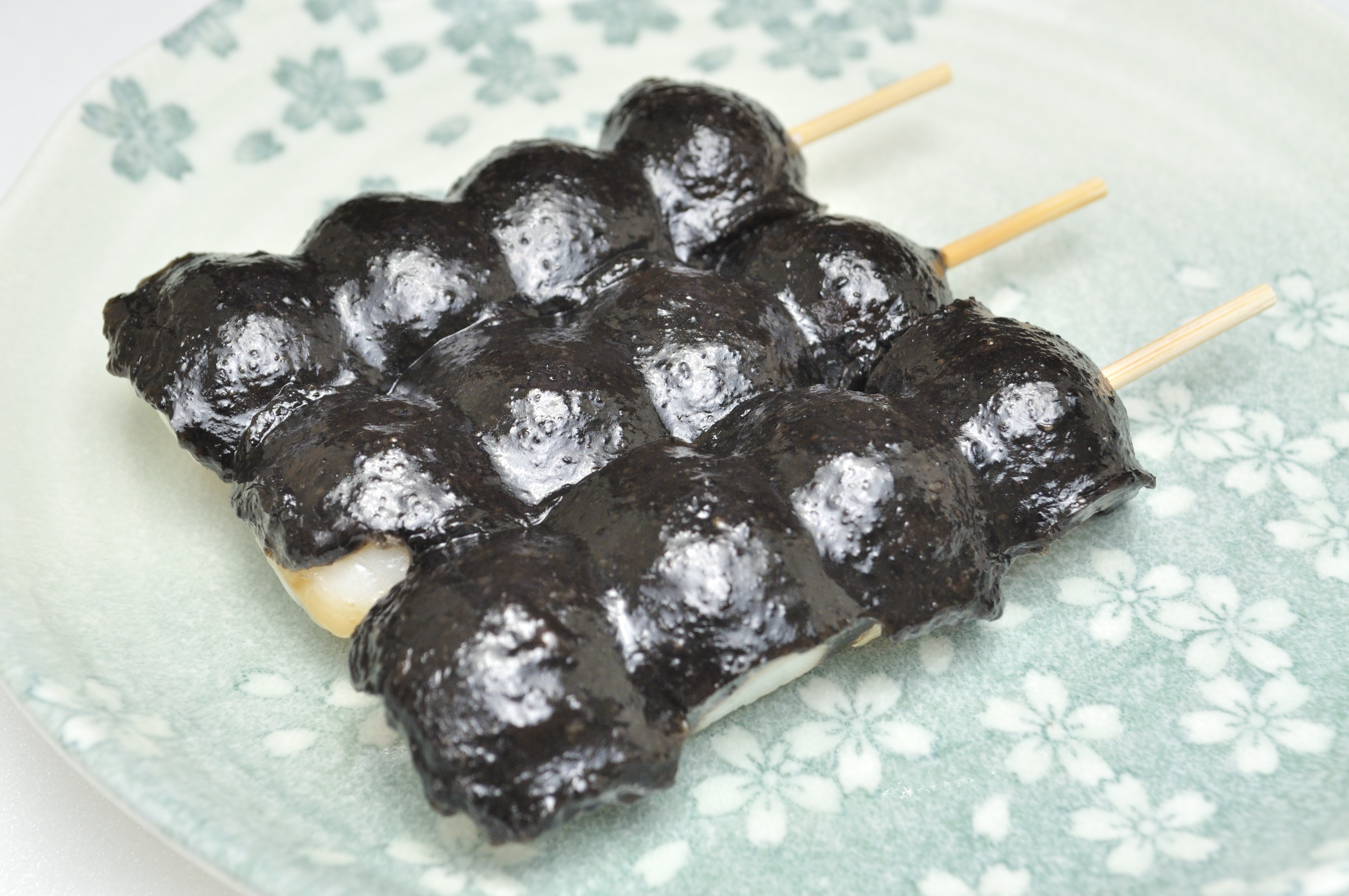
Dango with sweet sesame seed sauce

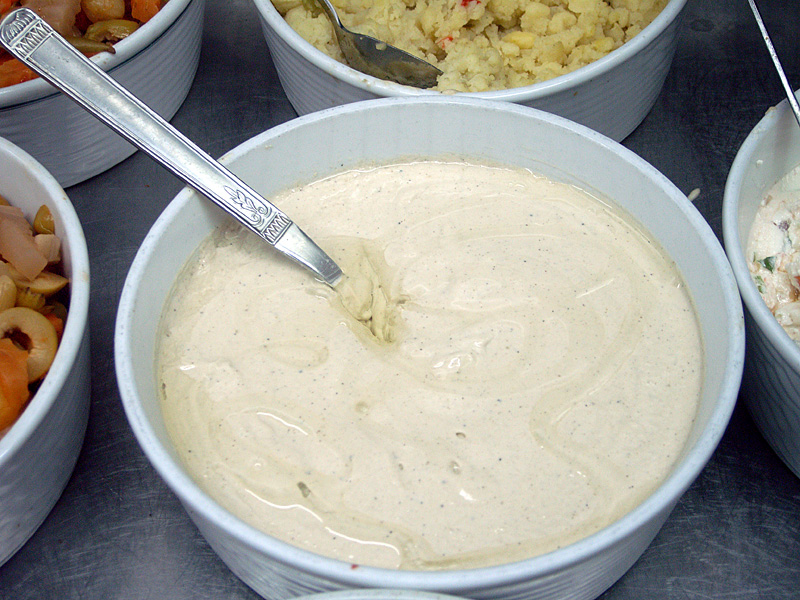
Tahini made of sesame seed paste

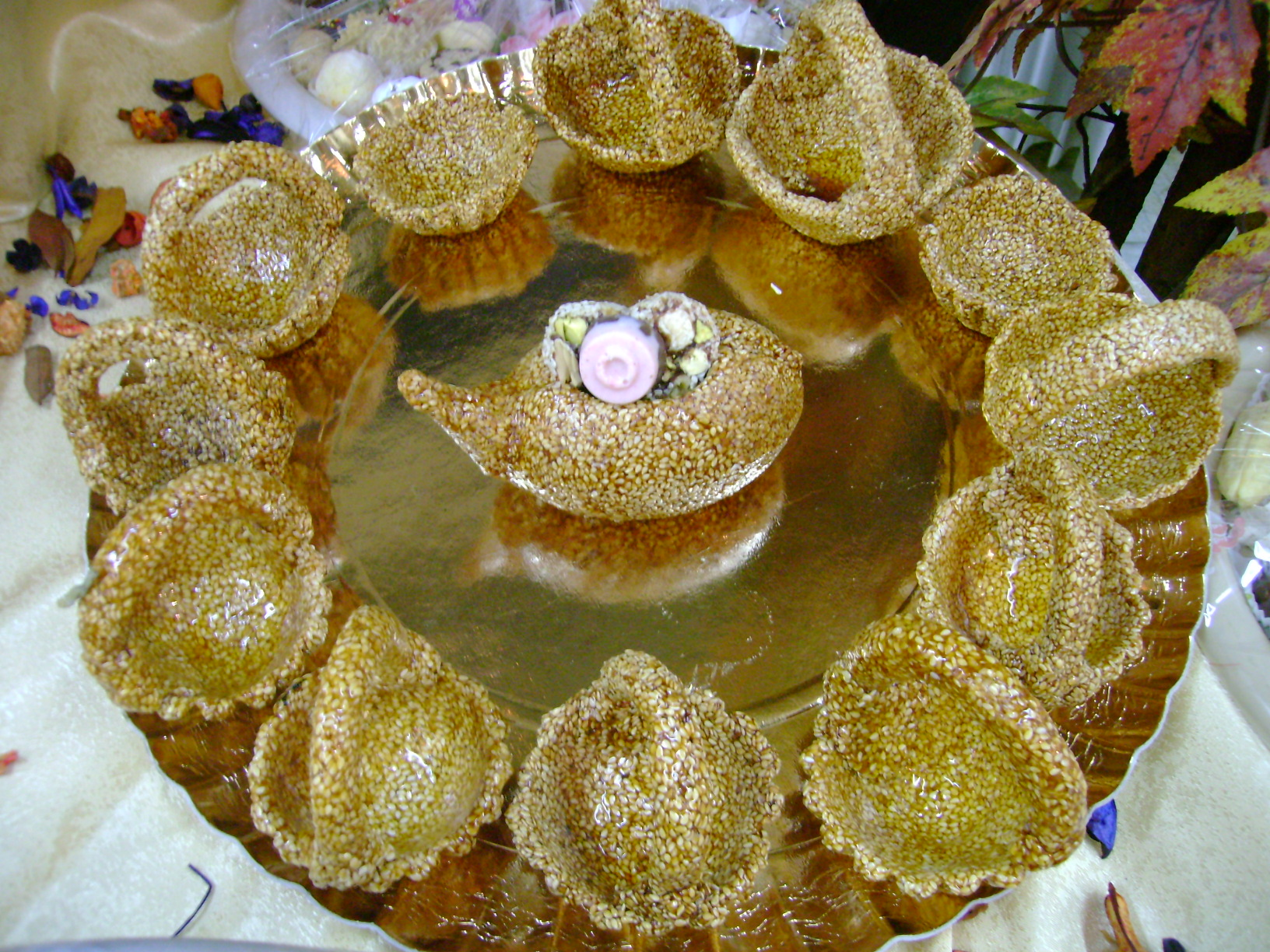
Sesame seeds are often added to baked goods and confectionery

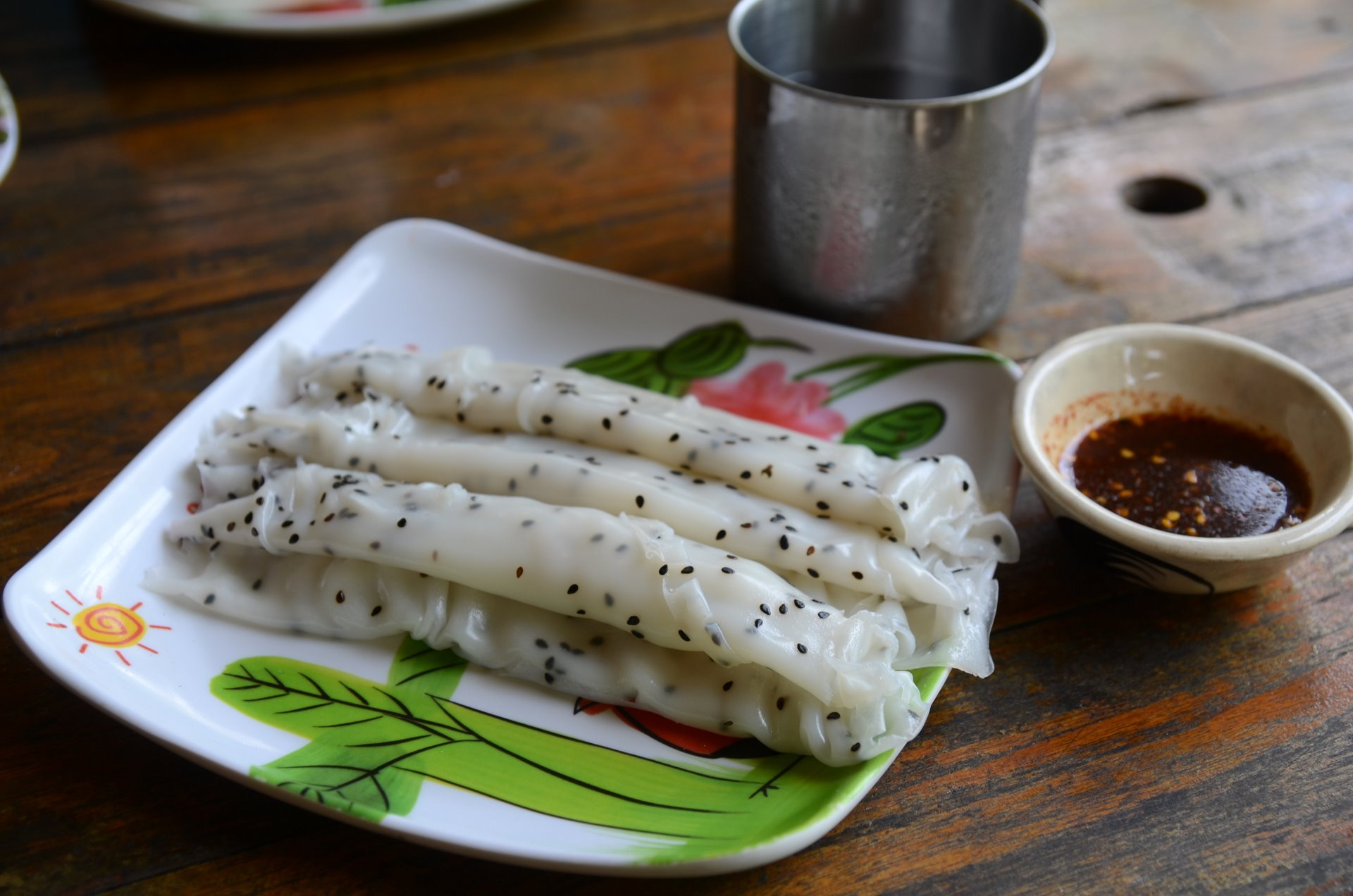
Rolled khao phan with black sesame seeds

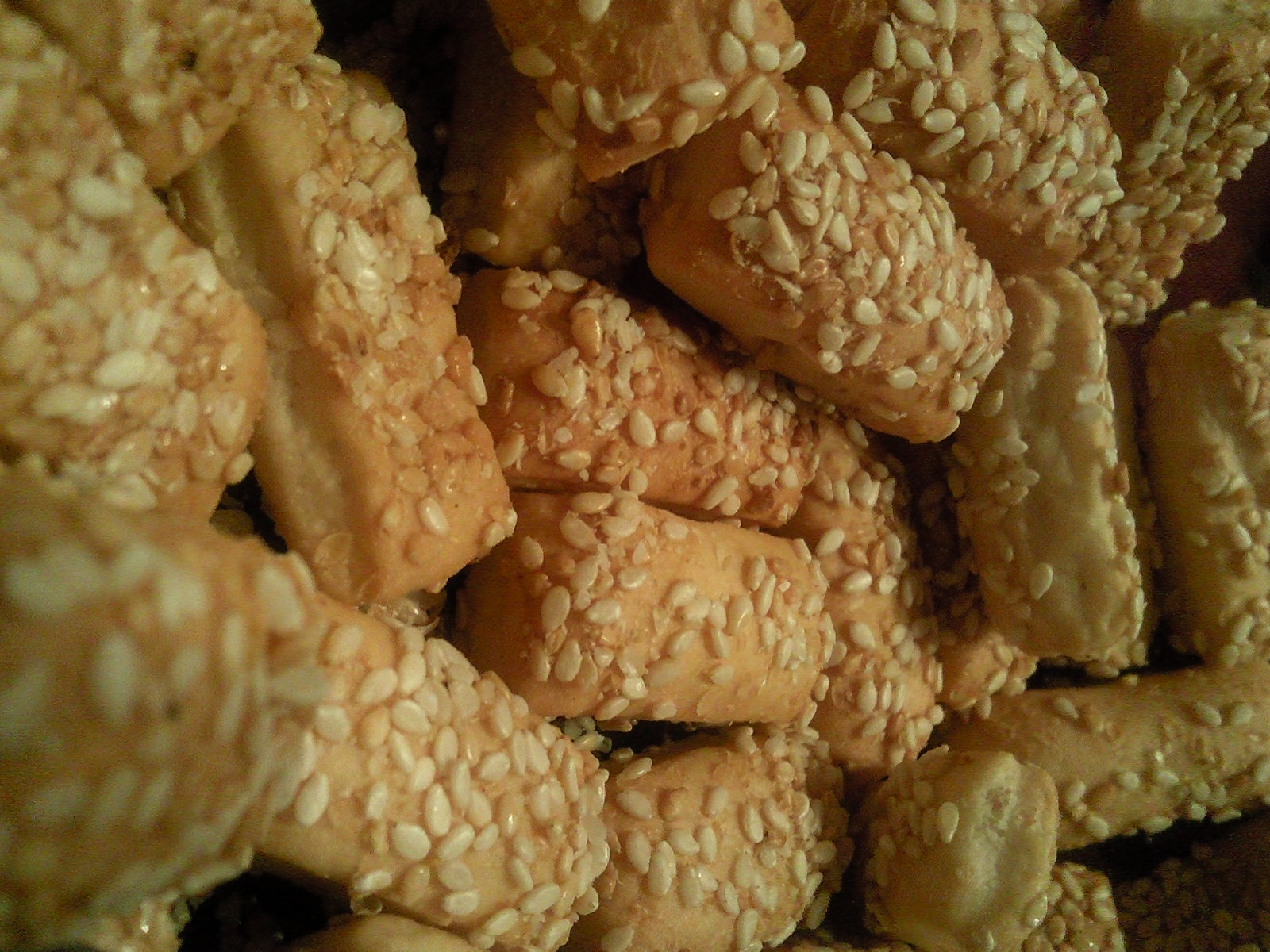
Sesame seed breadsticks

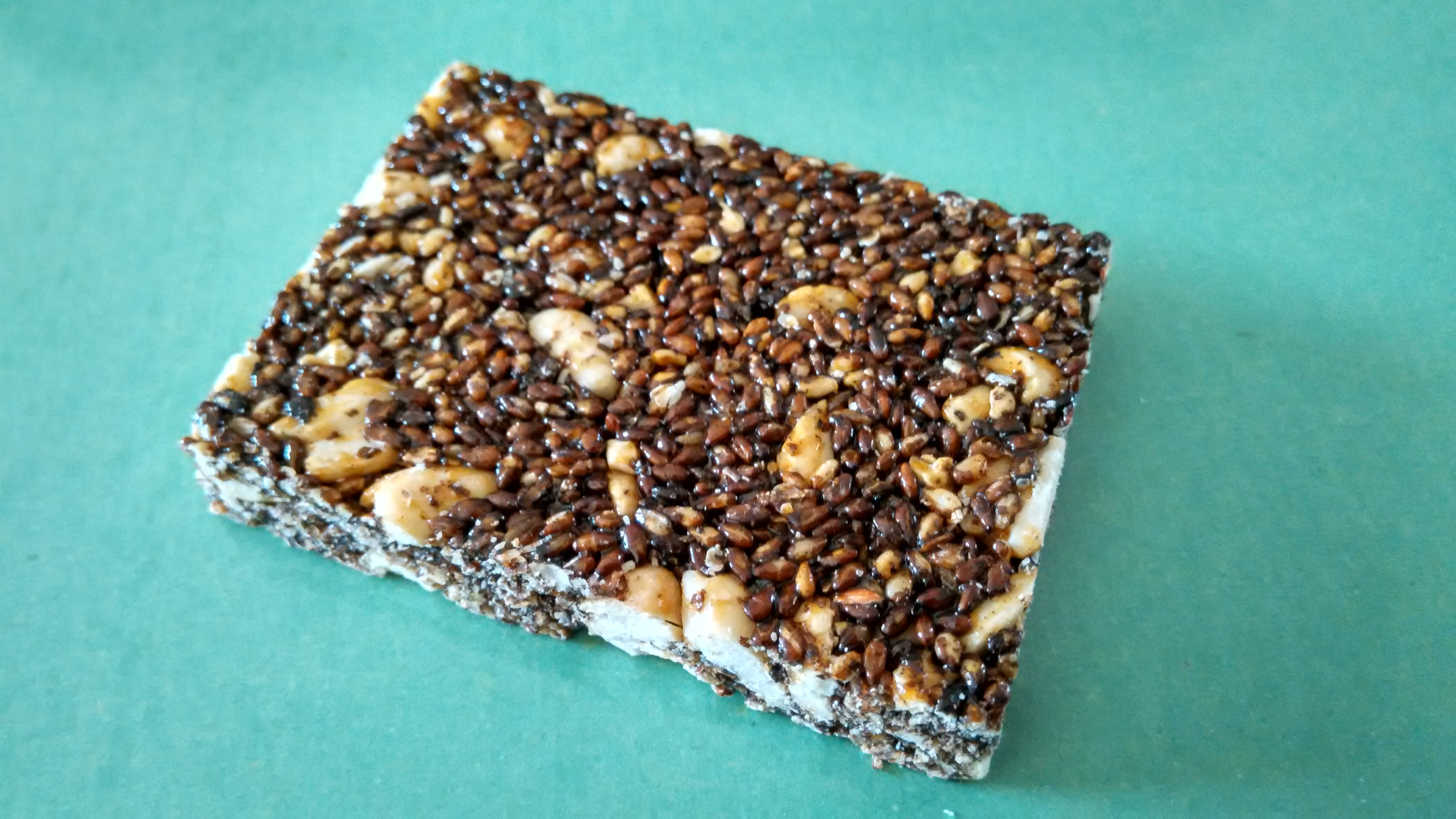
Sesame sweet cake

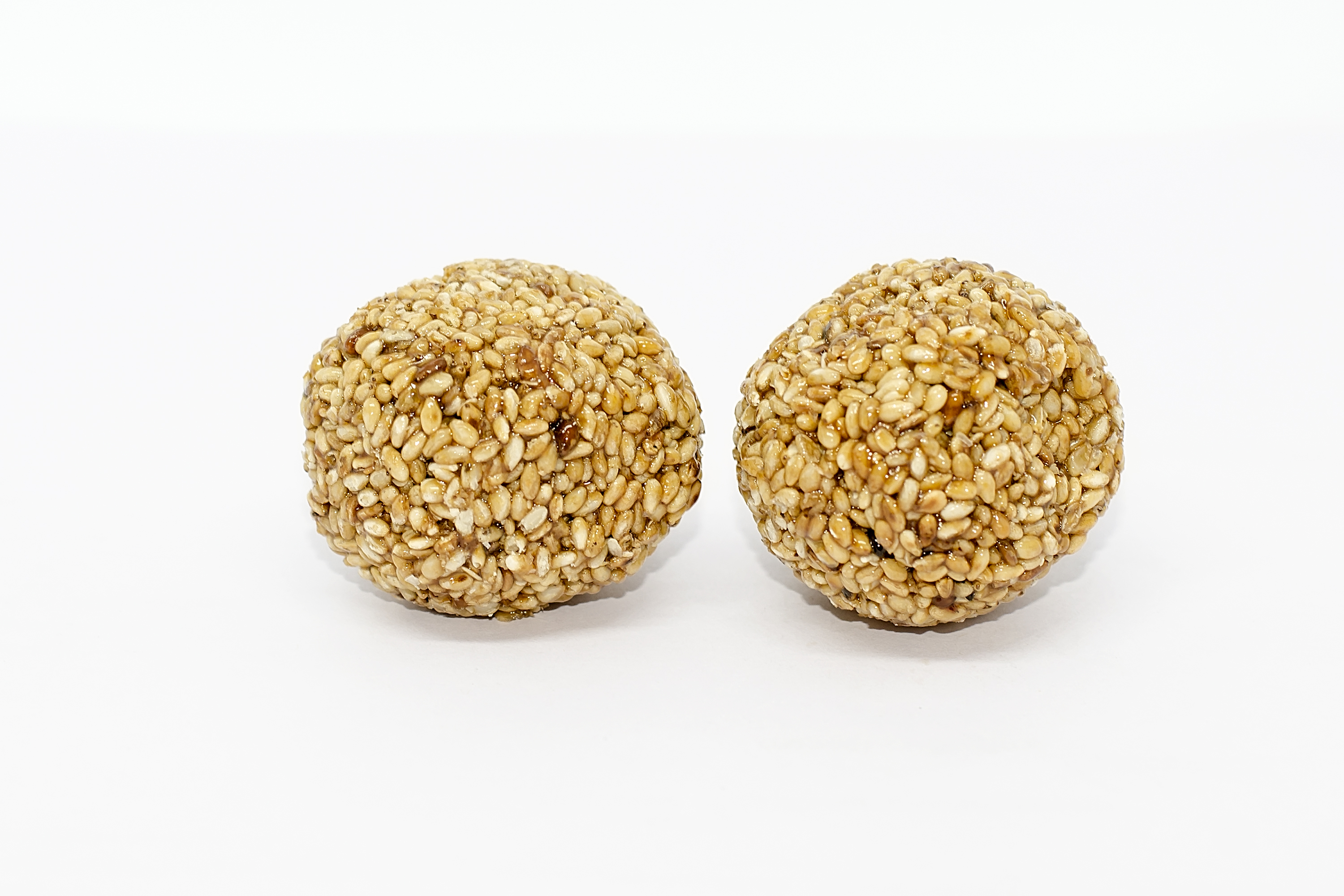
Sesame seed ball confection

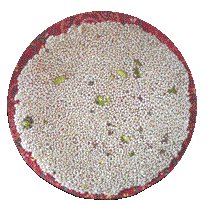
Til-patti – a sesame brittle-type confection from India

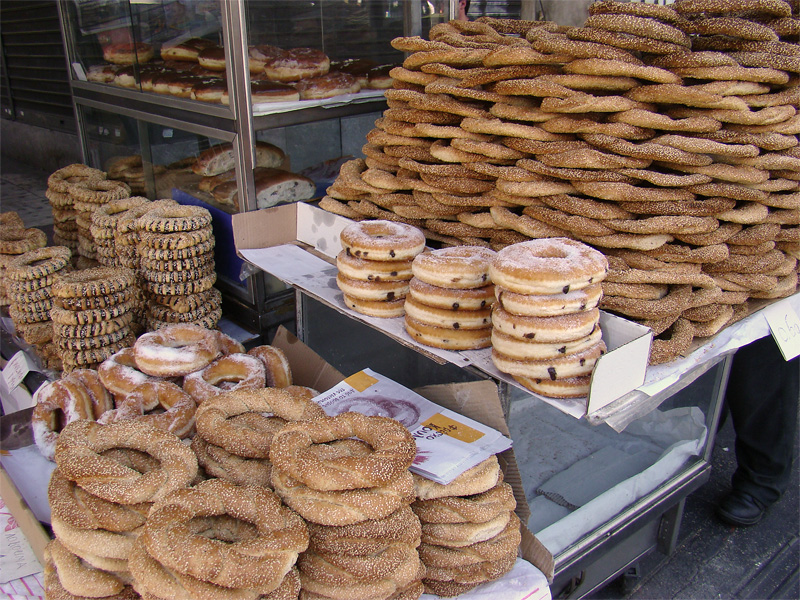
Simit, koulouri, or gevrek, a ring-shaped bread coated with sesame seeds

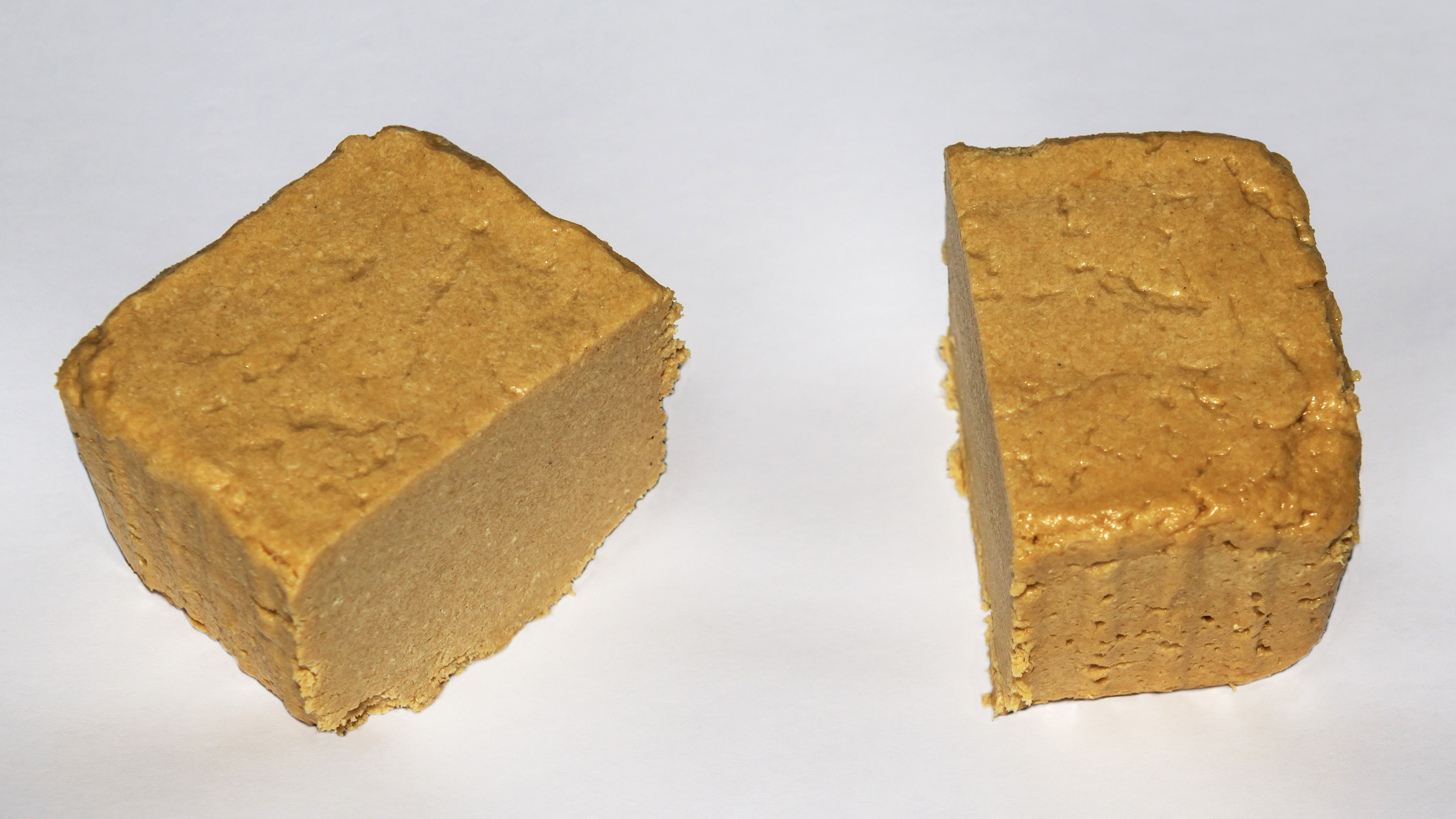
Halva, Turkey

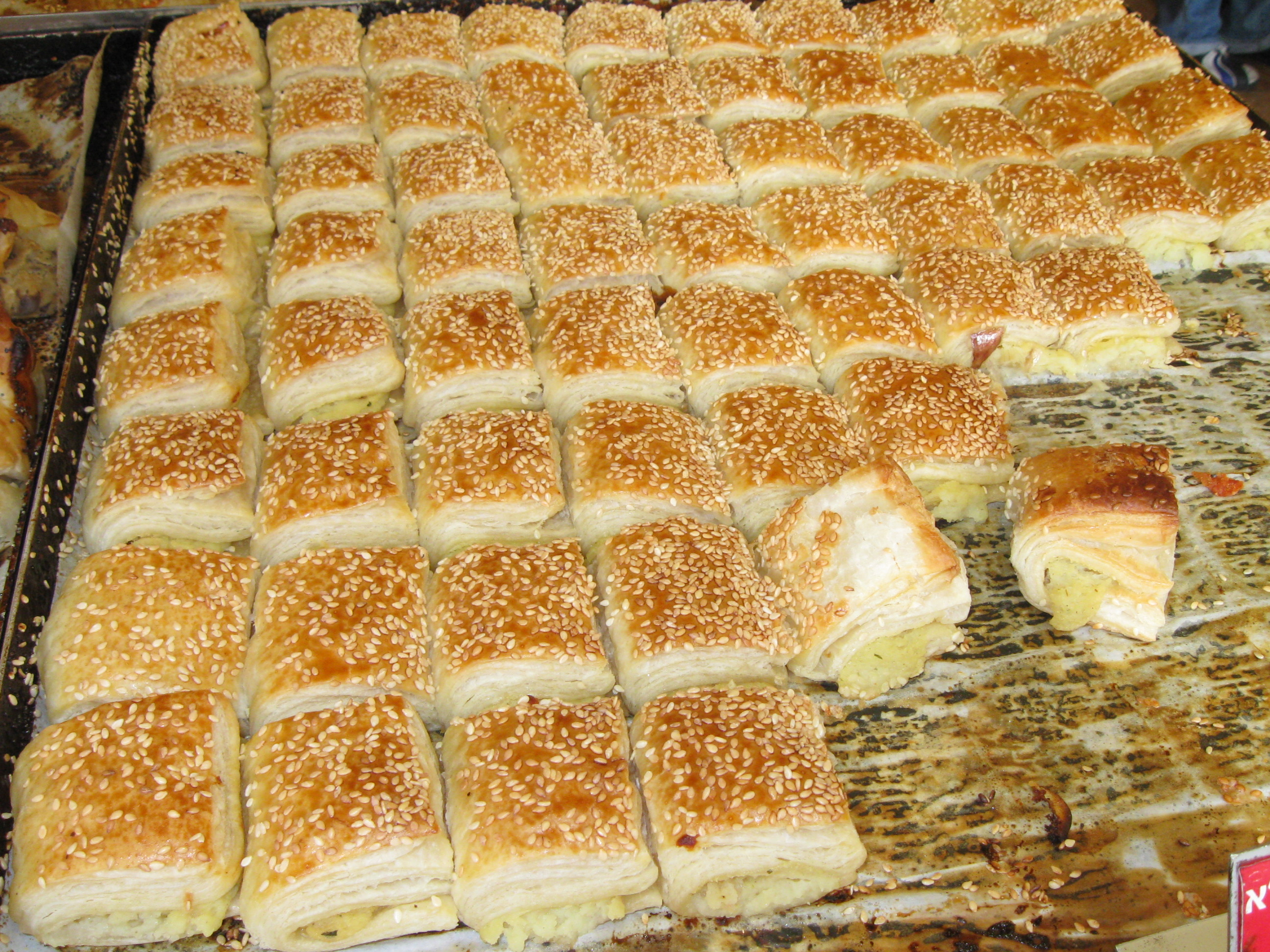
Typical Israeli Bourekas with sesame seeds

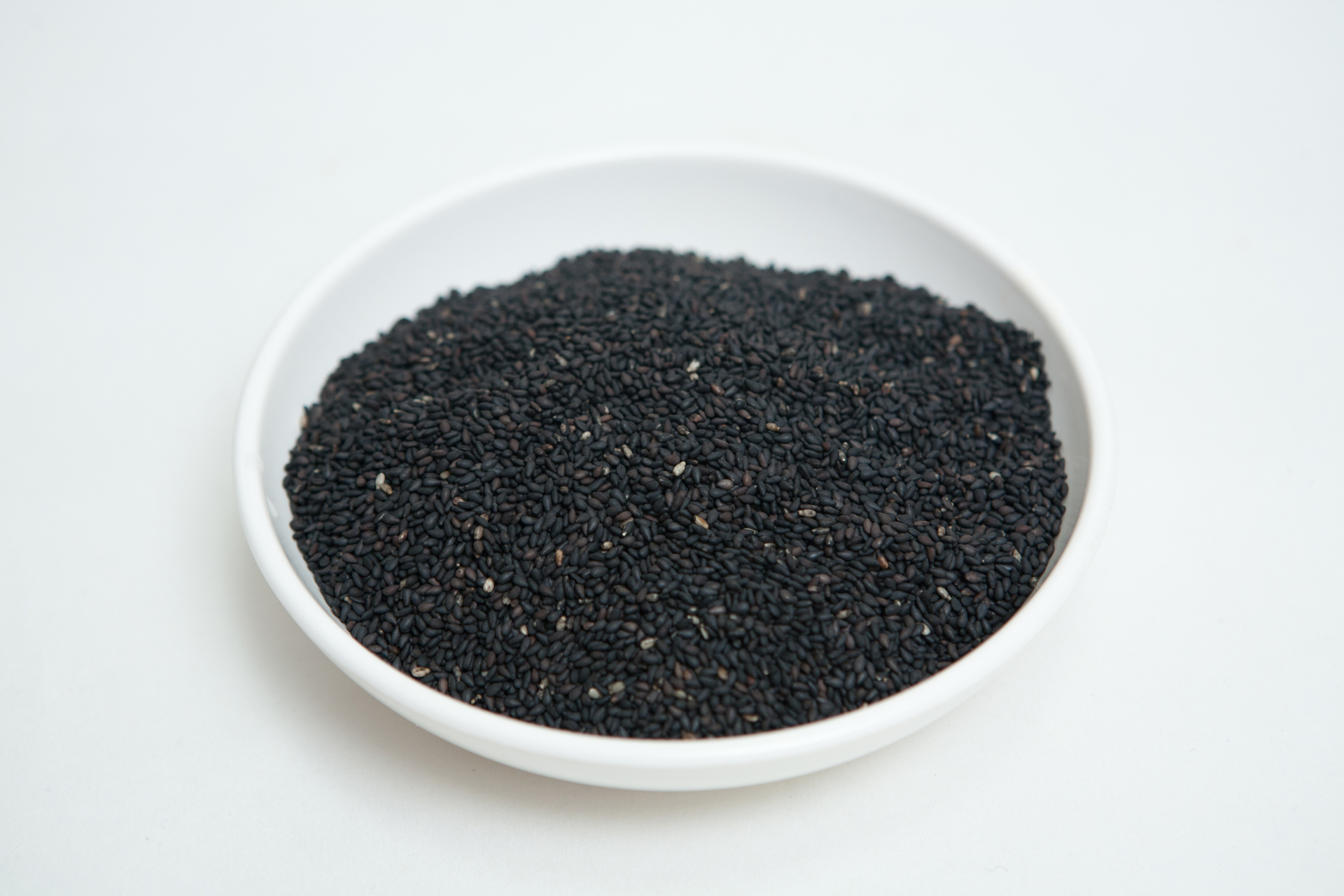
Black sesame seeds, not to be confused with nigella sativa

== In literature ==
In myths, the opening of the capsule releases the treasure of sesame seeds, as applied in the story of "Ali Baba and the Forty Thieves" when the phrase "Open sesame" magically opens a sealed cave. Upon ripening, sesame pods split, releasing a pop and possibly indicating the origin of this phrase.
