= Sesamolin =

Names
- Preferred IUPAC name 5-{(1S,3aR,4R,6aR)-4-[(2H-1,3-Benzodioxol-5-yl)oxy]tetrahydro-1H,3H-furo[3,4-c]furan-1-yl}-2H-1,3-benzodioxole

Identifiers
CAS Number	526-07-8
3D model (JSmol)	Interactive image
ChemSpider	91932
ECHA InfoCard	100.113.960
PubChem CID	101746
UNII	7A90TJ149G
CompTox Dashboard (EPA)	DTXSID90878472
- InChI: InChI=1S/C20H18O7/c1-3-15-17(25-9-23-15)5-11(1)19-13-7-22-20(14(13)8-21-19)27-12-2-4-16-18(6-12)26-10-24-16/h1-6,13-14,19-20H,7-10H2/t13-,14-,19+,20+/m0/s1 Key: ZZMNWJVJUKMZJY-AFHBHXEDSA-N; InChI=1/C20H18O7/c1-3-15-17(25-9-23-15)5-11(1)19-13-7-22-20(14(13)8-21-19)27-12-2-4-16-18(6-12)26-10-24-16/h1-6,13-14,19-20H,7-10H2/t13-,14-,19+,20+/m0/s1 Key: ZZMNWJVJUKMZJY-AFHBHXEDBO
- SMILES: c1cc2c(cc1[C@@H]3[C@H]4CO[C@@H]([C@H]4CO3)Oc5ccc6c(c5)OCO6)OCO2

Properties
Chemical formula	C_{20}H_{18}O_{7}
Molar mass	370.35 g/mol
- Except where otherwise noted, data are given for materials in their standard state (at 25 °C [77 °F], 100 kPa). Infobox references

Sesamolin is a lignan isolated from sesame oil. Sesamin and sesamolin are minor components of sesame oil.

== See also ==
- Sesamol, another phenolic component of sesame oil
- Pinoresinol, structural analogue in which the dioxolanes are ring-opened, also found in sesame seed oil
