= Oleosin =

Identifiers
- Symbol: Oleosin
- Pfam: PF01277
- Pfam clan: CL0111
- InterPro: IPR000136
- PROSITE: PDOC00639
Available protein structures:
- PDB: IPR000136 PF01277 (ECOD; PDBsum)
- AlphaFold: IPR000136; PF01277

Oleosins are structural proteins found in vascular plant oil bodies and in plant cells. Oil bodies are not considered organelles because they have a single layer membrane and lack the pre-requisite double layer membrane in order to be considered an organelle. They are found in plant parts with high oil content that undergo extreme desiccation as part of their maturation process, and help stabilize the bodies.

== Components ==
Oleosins are proteins of 16 kDa to 24 kDa and are composed of three domains: an N-terminal hydrophilic region of variable length (from 30 to 60 residues); a central hydrophobic domain of about 70 residues and a C-terminal amphipathic region of variable length (from 60 to 100 residues). The central hydrophobic domain is proposed to be made up of beta-strand structure and to interact with the lipids. It is the only domain whose sequence is conserved. Models show oleosins having a hairpin-like hydrophobic shape that is inserted inside the triacylglyceride (TAG), while the hydrophilic parts are left outside oil bodies.

Oleosins have been found on oil bodies of seeds, tapetum cells, and pollen but not fruits. Instead of a stabilizer of oil bodies, oleosins are believed to be involved in water-uptaking of pollen on stigma.

== Allergic reactions ==
Allergic reactions to oleosins from hazelnut, peanut and sesame oils have been confirmed, ranging from contact dermatitis to anaphylactic shock. These oil body associated proteins are at ~14 and ~17 kDa, named, respectively, Ses i 5 and Ses i 4. Commercial-grade peanut oil is often highly refined, which makes it safe for most peanut allergic individuals. In contrast, commercial-grade sesame oil is typically an unrefined product with a measurably higher protein content. In addition to being a food ingredient, sesame oil can be present in drug products, dietary supplements and topically applied cosmetics.

== Usage ==
Oleosins provide an easy way of purifying proteins which have been produced recombinantly in plants. If the protein is made as a fusion protein with oleosin and a protease recognition site is incorporated between them, the fusion protein will sit in the membrane of the oil body, which can be easily isolated by centrifugation. The oil droplets can then be mixed with aqueous medium again, and oleosin cleaved from the protein of interest. Centrifugation will cause two phases to separate again, and the aqueous medium now contains the purified protein.
