= Sesamin =

Names
- IUPAC name (7α,7′α,8α,8′α)-3,4:3′,4′-Bis[methylenebis(oxy)]-7,9′:7′,9-diepoxylignane
- Systematic IUPAC name 5,5′-[(1S,3aR,4S,6aR)-Tetrahydro-1H,3H-furo[3,4-c]furan-1,4-diyl]bis(2H-1,3-benzodioxole)
- Other names Fagarol; Sezamin; Pseudocubebin; Episesamin; Asarinin; Eleutheroside B4; D-(+)-Sesamin d-Sesamin (+)-Sesamin l-Sesamin

Identifiers
CAS Number	607-80-7
3D model (JSmol)	Interactive image
ChEBI	CHEBI:66470
ChEMBL	ChEMBL252915
ChemSpider	65258
ECHA InfoCard	100.124.366
KEGG	C10882
PubChem CID	5204
UNII	S7946O4P76
CompTox Dashboard (EPA)	DTXSID80231219
- InChI: InChI=1S/C20H18O6/c1-3-15-17(25-9-23-15)5-11(1)19-13-7-22-20(14(13)8-21-19)12-2-4-16-18(6-12)26-10-24-16/h1-6,13-14,19-20H,7-10H2/t13-,14-,19+,20+/m0/s1 Key: PEYUIKBAABKQKQ-AFHBHXEDSA-N; InChI=1/C20H18O6/c1-3-15-17(25-9-23-15)5-11(1)19-13-7-22-20(14(13)8-21-19)12-2-4-16-18(6-12)26-10-24-16/h1-6,13-14,19-20H,7-10H2/t13-,14-,19+,20+/m0/s1 Key: PEYUIKBAABKQKQ-AFHBHXEDBX
- SMILES: c1cc2c(cc1[C@@H]3[C@H]4CO[C@@H]([C@H]4CO3)c5ccc6c(c5)OCO6)OCO2

Properties
Chemical formula	C_{20}H_{18}O_{6}
Molar mass	354.35 g/mol
- Except where otherwise noted, data are given for materials in their standard state (at 25 °C [77 °F], 100 kPa). verify (what is ?) Infobox references

Sesamin is a lignan isolated from the bark of Fagara plants and from sesame oil. It has been used as a dietary fat-reduction supplement. Its major metabolite is enterolactone, which has an elimination half life of less than 6 hours. Sesamin and sesamolin are minor components of sesame oil, on average comprising 14% of the oil by mass.

== See also ==
- Sesamol, another phenolic component of sesame oil
