= Sesame oil =

Edible oil from sesame seed

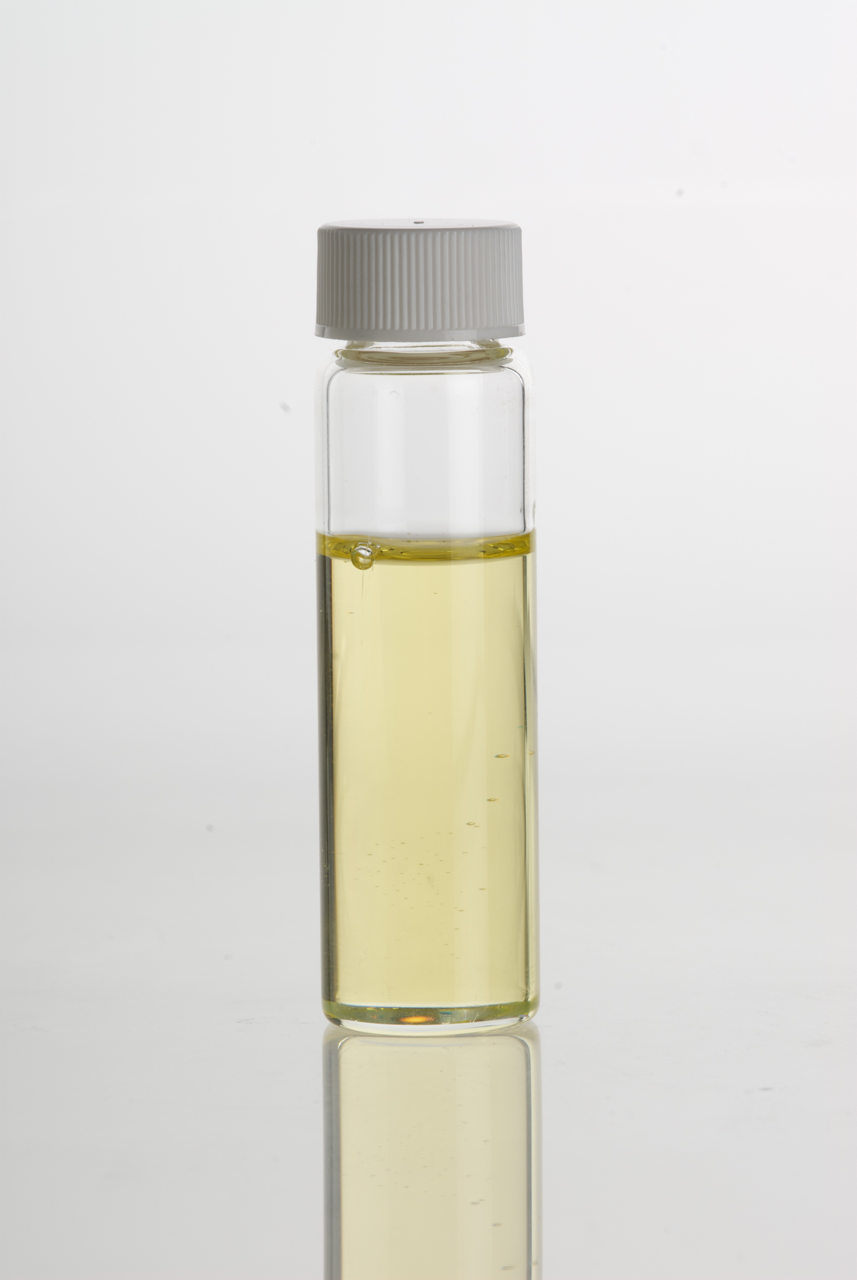
Light sesame seed oil in a glass vial

Sesame oil is an edible vegetable oil derived from sesame seeds. The oil is one of the earliest-known crop-based oils. Worldwide mass modern production is limited due to the inefficient manual harvesting process required to extract the oil. Oil made from raw seeds, which may or may not be cold-pressed, is used as a cooking oil. Oil made from toasted seeds is used for its distinctive nutty aroma and taste, although it may be unsuitable for frying, which makes it taste burnt and bitter.

In 2023, world production of sesame oil was 1.2 million tonnes, led by India and Myanmar together with 34% of the total.

== Manufacturing ==
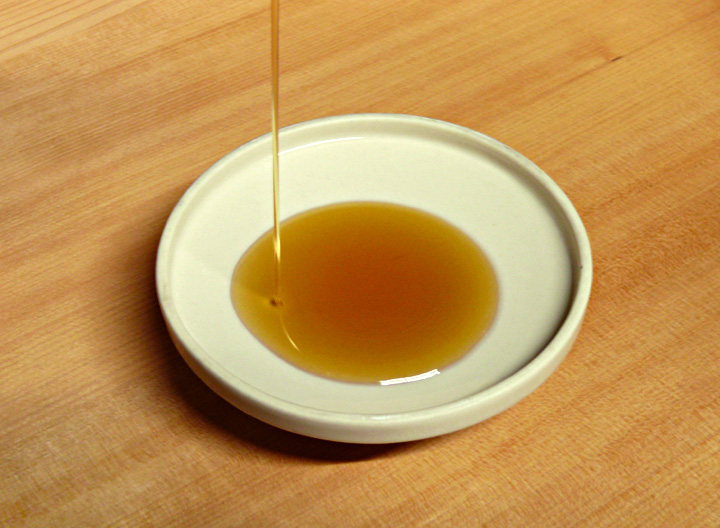
Dark brown sesame oil derived from roasted/toasted sesame seeds

Sesame seeds are protected by a capsule which bursts only when the seeds are completely ripe, a process called dehiscence. The dehiscence time tends to vary, so farmers cut plants by hand and place them together in an upright position to continue ripening, until all the capsules have opened.

While some manufacturers will further refine sesame oil through solvent extraction, neutralization, and bleaching in order to improve its cosmetic aspects, sesame oil derived from quality seeds already possesses a pleasant taste and does not require further purification before it can be consumed. Many consumers prefer unrefined sesame oil due to their belief that the refining process removes important nutrients. Flavor, traditionally an important attribute, was best in oils produced from mild crushing.

Sesame oil is one of the more stable natural oils, but can still benefit from refrigeration and from limited exposure to light and high temperatures during extraction, processing, and storage; this minimizes nutrient loss through oxidation and rancidity. Storage in amber-colored or opaque bottles can help to minimize light exposure.

Sesame oil is a polyunsaturated (PUFA) semi-drying oil. Commercial sesame oil varies in color from light to deep reddish-yellow depending on the color of the seed processed and the method of milling. Provided that the oil is milled from well-cleaned seed, it can be refined and bleached easily to yield a light-colored limpid oil. Sesame oil is rich in oleic and linoleic acids, which together account for 85% of the total fatty acids. Sesame oil has a relatively high percentage of unsaponifiable matter (1.5-2.3%) (i.e. the fraction incapable of being made into soap, including steroids and vitamin A, and these fractions are often studied for potential health benefits). In India and in some other European countries, it is obligatory to add sesame oil (5-10%) to margarine and generally to hydrogenated vegetable fats which are commonly used as adulterants for butter or ghee.

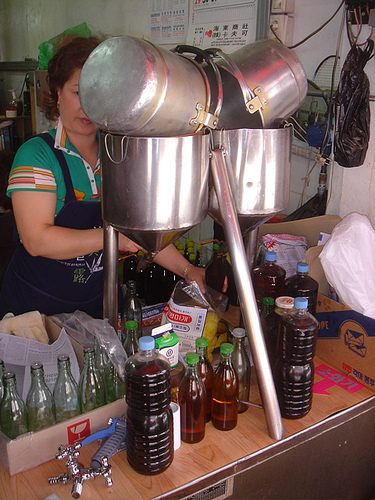
Bottling sesame oil at Moran Market, Seongnam, South Korea

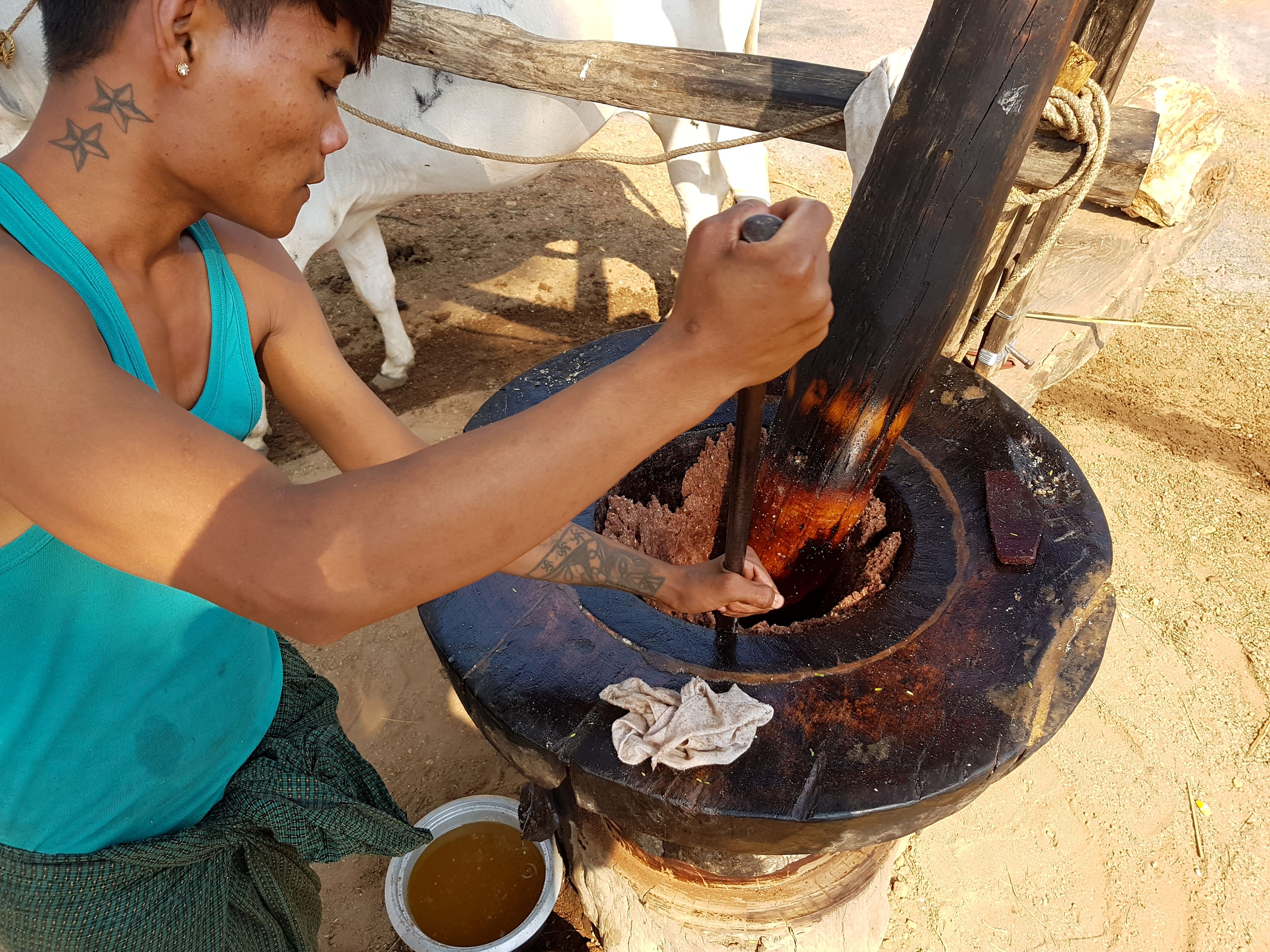
Extracting sesame oil by a bullock driven wooden press, Myanmar

== Production ==
Sesame oil production 2023, tonnes
India	264,000
Myanmar	148,500
Nigeria	48,602
Central African Republic	44,820
Turkey	40,200
Saudi Arabia	27,543
World	1,201,842
FAOSTAT of the United Nations

In 2023, world production of sesame oil was 1.2 million tonnes, with India and Myanmar together accounting for 34% of the total (table).

Production of sesame oil

Yearly per capita supply of sesame oil

== Nutrients ==
Sesame oil
Nutritional value per 100 g (3.5 oz)
- Energy: 3,699 kJ (884 kcal)
- Carbohydrates: 0.00 g
- Fat: 100.00 g
- Saturated: 14.200 g
- Monounsaturated: 39.700 g
- Polyunsaturated: 41.700 g
- Protein: 0.00 g
Vitamins and minerals
Vitamins	Quantity %DV^{†}
Vitamin C	0% 0.0 mg
Vitamin E	9% 1.40 mg
Vitamin K	11% 13.6 μg
Minerals	Quantity %DV^{†}
Calcium	0% 0 mg
Iron	0% 0.00 mg
Magnesium	0% 0 mg
Phosphorus	0% 0 mg
Potassium	0% 0 mg
Sodium	0% 0 mg
- Full Link to USDA Database entry
- ^{†}Percentages estimated using US recommendations for adults, except for potassium, which is estimated based on expert recommendation from the National Academies.

Sesame oil is 100% fat, with a 100 g (3.5 oz) (100 ml) reference amount supplying 884 calories of food energy (table). The only micronutrient having significant content in sesame oil is vitamin K, providing 11% of the Daily Value per 100 grams (table).

For fats, sesame oil is approximately equal in monounsaturated fat (oleic acid, 40% of total) and polyunsaturated fat (linoleic acid, 42% of total), together accounting for 80% of the total fat content (table). The remaining oil content is primarily palmitic acid, a saturated fat (about 9% of total, USDA table).

== Potential for allergy ==
As with numerous seed and nut foods, sesame oil may produce an allergic reaction, although the incidence of this effect is rare, estimated at 0.1–0.2% of the population. Reports of sesame allergy are growing in developed countries during the 21st century, with the allergic mechanism from oil exposure expressed as contact dermatitis, possibly resulting from hypersensitivity to lignin-like compounds.

== Uses ==
=== Cooking ===
Sesame oil is used for stir-frying, marinades, and as a finishing oil to add nutty flavor to Asian dishes, with light sesame oil best for cooking and toasted sesame oil ideal for flavoring due to its intense taste.

Sesame oil made from seeds that have not been toasted is a pale yellow liquid with a pleasant grain-like odor and somewhat nutty taste, and is used as frying oil. Oil made from pressed and toasted sesame seeds is amber-colored and aromatic, and is used as a flavoring agent in the final stages of cooking.

Despite sesame oil's high proportion (41%) of polyunsaturated (omega-6) fatty acids, it is least prone, among cooking oils with high smoke points, to turn rancid when kept in the open. This is due to the natural antioxidants, such as sesamol, present in the oil.

Light sesame oil has a high smoke point and is suitable for deep-frying. Toasted sesame oil is not suitable, but it can be used to stir fry meats and vegetables, for sautéing, and to make omelettes.

Sesame oil is most popular in continental Asia, especially in East Asia and the South Indian states of Karnataka, Andhra Pradesh, and Tamil Nadu, where its widespread use is similar to that of olive oil in the Mediterranean.

- East Asian cuisines often use roasted sesame oil for seasoning during cooking, or at the table.
  - The Chinese use sesame oil in the preparation of meals.
  - In Japan, rāyu is made of chili and sesame oil and used as a spicy topping on various foods, or mixed with vinegar and soy sauce and used as a dip.
  - In Korea, meat dishes such as samgyeopsal and galbi are eaten with a dipping sauce made of sesame oil and salt. Gochujang and sesame oil are also added to various types of bibimbap.
- In South India, before the advent of modern refined oils produced on a large scale, sesame oil was traditionally used for curries and gravies. It continues to be used, particularly in Tamil Nadu and Andhra Pradesh, mixed with foods that are hot and spicy, as it neutralizes the heat. It is often mixed in with a special spice powder that accompanies idli and dosa, as well as rice mixed with spice powders (example, paruppu podi).

=== Religious uses ===
In Mandaeism, anointing sesame oil, called misha (ࡌࡉࡔࡀ) in Mandaic, is used during rituals such as the masbuta (baptism) and masiqta (death mass), both of which are performed by Mandaean priests.

=== Industrial uses ===
In industry, sesame oil may be used as:

- A solvent in injected drugs or intravenous drip solutions
- A cosmetics carrier oil
- A coating for stored grains to prevent weevil attacks. The oil also has synergistic effects with some insecticides.

Low-grade oil is used locally in soaps, paints, lubricants, and illuminants.

== History ==
Historically, sesame was cultivated more than 5000 years ago as a drought-tolerant crop which was able to grow where other crops failed. Sesame was probably first domesticated in the North West Indian subcontinent by people arriving from the near east. By the time of the Indus Valley Civilization Sesame was the main oil crop cultivated. It was probably exported to Mesopotamia around 2500 BCE.

== See also ==
- Peanut oil
- Sesame
- Tahini
