= Silychristin =

Natural chemical compound

- Silicristin A (2R, 3S)

- Silicristin B (2S, 3R)

Names
- IUPAC name Silychristin A = (2R,3R)-3,5,7-trihydroxy-2-((2R,3S)-7-hydroxy-2-(4-hydroxy-3-methoxyphenyl)-3-(hydroxymethyl)-2,3-dihydrobenzofuran-5-yl)chroman-4-one Silychristin B = (2R,3R)-3,5,7-trihydroxy-2-((2S,3R)-7-hydroxy-2-(4-hydroxy-3-methoxyphenyl)-3-(hydroxymethyl)-2,3-dihydrobenzofuran-5-yl)chroman-4-one
- Other names Silichristin, Silicristin, Silycristin

Identifiers
| CAS Number | 33889-69-9 |
| 3D model (JSmol) | Interactive image |
| ChEBI | CHEBI:9143 |
| ChEMBL | ChEMBL130493 |
| ChemSpider | 390364 |
| EC Number | 251-720-9 |
| KEGG | C08717 |
| PubChem CID | 441764 |
| UNII | LK279ER14X |
- InChI: InChI=1S/C25H22O10/c1-33-18-6-10(2-3-15(18)28)23-14(9-26)13-4-11(5-17(30)25(13)35-23)24-22(32)21(31)20-16(29)7-12(27)8-19(20)34-24/h2-8,14,22-24,26-30,32H,9H2,1H3/t14-,22+,23+,24-/m1/s1 Key: BMLIIPOXVWESJG-LMBCONBSSA-N
- SMILES: COC1=C(C=CC(=C1)[C@H]2[C@@H](C3=C(O2)C(=CC(=C3)[C@@H]4[C@H](C(=O)C5=C(C=C(C=C5O4)O)O)O)O)CO)O

Properties
| Chemical formula | C_{25}H_{22}O_{10} |
| Molar mass | 482.4 g/mol |

Hazards
- GHS labelling
| Pictograms | (GHS07: Exclamation mark) |
| Signal word | Warning |
| Hazard statements | H302 |
| Precautionary statements | P264, P270, P301+P312, P330, P501 |
- Except where otherwise noted, data are given for materials in their standard state (at 25 °C [77 °F], 100 kPa). Infobox references

Silychristin (also known as silichristin) is a natural product and one of the constituents of silymarin, the standardized, active extract of the fruit of milk thistle, Silybum marianum. It is the second most abundant constituent in silymarin, after silybin. Silychristin is a flavonolignan, along with many other silymarin constituents (such as silybin, isosilybin, silydianin, etc.), meaning it is composed up of a flavonoid and a lignan. It is estimated that up to 65–80% of silymarin extract is made up of flavonolignans, like silychristin, which give silymarin its well known potent antioxidant and hepatoprotective properties. Silychristin can exist as two stereoisomers, silychristin A (2R, 3S) and silychristin B (2S, 3R). The marianum variety of S. marianum (purple corollas) includes silychristin A as a major flavonolignan constituent, while the lesser known and studied albiflorum variety (white corollas) includes unique flavonolignans, including silyhermin, (–)-silandrin, and (+)-silymonin.

== Toxicity ==
Several studies have documented the potentially dangerous effects of silychristin and of the silymarin mixture in general on the thyroid system. All of the flavonolignan compounds found in the silymarin mixture seem to block the uptake of thyroid hormones into the cells by selectively blocking the MCT8 transmembrane transporter. The authors of this study noted that especially silychristin seems to be perhaps the most powerful and selective inhibitor known so far for the MCT8 transporter. Due to the essential role played by the thyroid hormone in human metabolism in general it is believed that the intake of silymarin can lead to disruptions of the thyroid system. Because the thyroid hormones and the MCT8 as well are known to play a critical role during early and fetal development, the administration of silymarin during pregnancy is especially thought to be dangerous, potentially leading to the Allan–Herndon–Dudley syndrome, a brain development disorder that causes both moderate to severe intellectual disability and problems with speech and movement.

== Biosynthesis ==
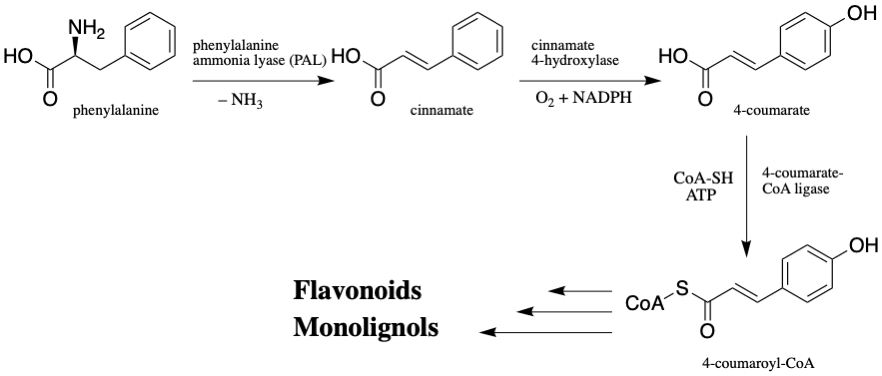
Natural flavonolignans, which include silychristin, are biosynthesized by the oxidative coupling of a flavonoid and a phenylpropanoid moiety. The flavonoid moiety can be any number of flavonoids, including taxifolin, naringenin, luteolin, etc., while the phenylpropanoid moiety includes coniferyl alcohol, a monolignol, in most all flavonolignans. The two biosynthetic precursors specifically for silychristin are taxifolin and coniferyl alcohol, which are both biosynthesized via the phenylpropanoid pathway, a pathway which converts phenylalanine into 4-coumaroyl-CoA.

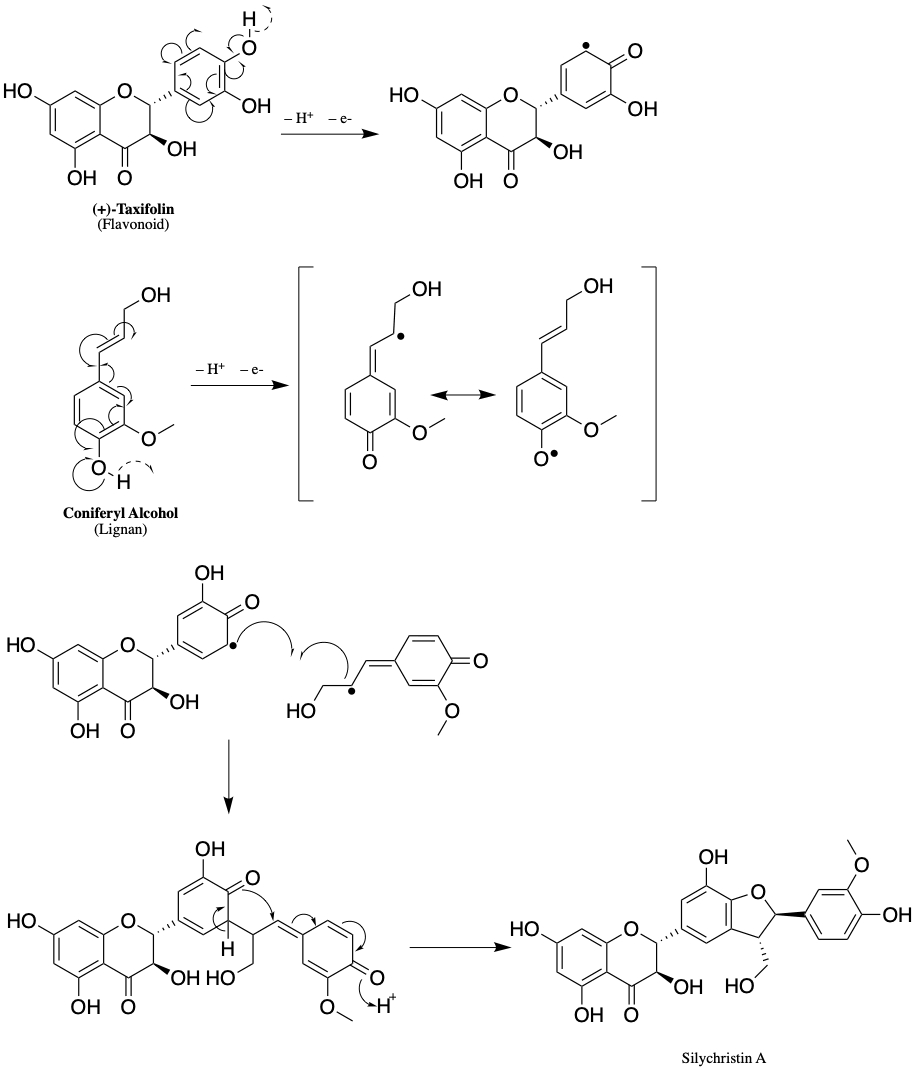
Still much is not known today about the specific enzymes and mechanism of the biosynthesis of silychristin and its related flavononlignan counterparts in S. marianum. The most widely accepted hypothesis for the biosynthesis of flavonolignans is via an oxidative radicalization of both the flavonoid precursor and coniferyl alcohol, followed by coupling of the two radicals, and then proton transfer(s) in order to aromatize the intermediate to get the final product. Although the enzyme catalyzing this oxidative coupling of flavonolignans has not yet been fully characterized, peroxidase enzymes have been hypothesized as likely candidates because they are radical generators.
