= Allan–Herndon–Dudley syndrome =

- This condition is inherited in an X-linked recessive manner
- Specialty: Medical genetics, neurology, pediatrics
- Named after: William Allan; Florence C. Dudley; C. Nash Herndon

Allan–Herndon–Dudley syndrome (AHDS) is a rare X-linked inherited disorder of brain development that causes both moderate to severe intellectual disability and problems with speech and movement.

Allan–Herndon–Dudley syndrome, which is named eponymously for William Allan, Florence C. Dudley, and C. Nash Herndon, results from a mutation of the thyroid hormone transporter MCT8 (also referred to as SLC16A2). Consequently, thyroid hormones are unable to enter the nervous system, which depends on thyroid signaling for proper function and development.

== Signs and symptoms ==
It is estimated that 80–99% of people with Allan–Herndon–Dudley syndrome will have biparietal narrowing (narrowing of skull), ataxia, abnormalities of the neck, and both absent speech development and aphasia. Weak muscle tone (hypotonia) and underdevelopment of many muscles (muscle hypoplasia) are common in children with Allan–Herndon–Dudley syndrome. Development of joint deformities called contractures, which restrict the movement of certain joints, are common as people age. Mobility is further limited by abnormal muscle stiffness (spasticity), muscle weakness, and involuntary movements of the arms and legs. Many people with Allan–Herndon–Dudley syndrome are unable to walk independently and become wheelchair-reliant by adulthood.

== Endocrine phenotype ==
The typical hormonal signature of AHDS is marked by low free T4 and normal or elevated free T3 concentration, which translates to increased calculated deiodinase activity (SPINA-GD).

T3-thyrotoxicosis contributes to major comorbidities in MCT8 deficiency, including cardiovascular conditions and osteopenia. It is assumed to be a major reason for the significantly increased fatality in the Allan-Herndon-Dudley syndrome.

== Genetics ==
This condition is inherited in an X-linked recessive pattern. A condition is considered X-linked if the mutated gene that causes the disorder is located on the X chromosome, one of the two sex chromosomes. In males (who have only one X chromosome), one altered copy of the gene in each cell is sufficient to cause the condition. In females (who have two X chromosomes), a mutation must be present in both copies of the gene to cause the disorder. Males are affected by X-linked recessive disorders much more frequently than females. A striking characteristic of X-linked inheritance is that fathers cannot pass X-linked traits to their sons.

In X-linked recessive inheritance, a female with one altered copy of the gene in each cell is called a carrier. She can pass on the mutated gene, but usually does not experience signs and symptoms of the disorder. Carriers of SLC16A2 mutations have normal intelligence and do not experience problems with movement. Some carriers have been diagnosed with thyroid disease, a condition which is relatively common in the general population. It is unclear whether thyroid disease is related to SLC16A2 mutations in these cases.

== Pathogenesis ==
Mutations in the SLC16A2 gene cause Allan–Herndon–Dudley syndrome. The SLC16A2 gene, also known as MCT8, provides instructions for making a protein that plays a critical role in the development of the nervous system. This protein transports a particular hormone into nerve cells in the developing brain. This hormone, called triiodothyronine or T3, is produced by the thyroid. T3 appears to be critical for the normal formation and growth of nerve cells, as well as the development of junctions between nerve cells (synapses) where cell-to-cell communication occurs. T3 and other forms of thyroid hormone also help regulate the development of other organs and control the rate of chemical reactions in the body.

Gene mutations alter the structure and function of the SLC16A2 protein. As a result, this protein is unable to transport T3 into nerve cells effectively. A lack of this critical hormone in certain parts of the brain disrupts normal brain development, resulting in intellectual disability and problems with movement. Excess amounts of T3 circulate in the bloodstream. Impaired uptake in certain cell types due to MCT8 mutations is the primary cause of this, with deiodination taking on a more secondary role. Increased T3 levels in the blood may be toxic to some organs and contribute to the signs and symptoms of Allan–Herndon–Dudley syndrome.

The signature of low T4 and high T3 was for a long time assumed to be caused by either compensatory hyperdeiodination or impaired uptake of T3 in target tissues. A third hypotheses suggested it to ensue from impaired outward transport of thyroxine from thyroid cells and subsequently substrate-mediated overactivity of intrathyroidal deiodinases. This latter hypothesis is supported by results of in silico experiments with computer simulations.

Several studies have documented the potentially dangerous effects of the silymarin mixture on the MCT8 transporter. All of the flavonolignan compounds found in the silymarin mixture seem to block the uptake of thyroid hormones into the cells by selectively blocking the MCT8 transmembrane transporter. The authors of several studies noted that silychristin, one of the compounds of the silymarin mixture is an especially powerful and selective inhibitor for the MCT8 transporter. Due to the essential role played by the thyroid hormone in human metabolism in general it is believed that the intake of silymarin can lead to disruptions of the thyroid system. Because the thyroid hormones and the MCT8 as well are known to play a critical role during early and fetal development, the administration of silymarin during pregnancy is especially thought to be dangerous, potentially leading to the Allan–Herndon–Dudley syndrome.

== Treatment ==
In May 2013, the US FDA granted Orphan drug status to Diiodothyropropionic acid (DITPA) in the treatment of MCT8 deficiency. This was following the use of DITPA towards a child in Australia, under compassionate grounds.

Theoretical considerations suggested TRIAC (triiodothyroacetate or tiratricol, a natural non-classical thyroid hormone) to be beneficial. In 2014, a case was demonstrated in which therapy with TRIAC in early childhood led to significant improvement of cognition and mobility. A first clinical trial demonstrated TRIAC to be safe and effective. The efficacy of TRIAC was confirmed in a long-term retrospective cohort study.

Treatment control is highly complex for TRIAC. The results of several biomarkers have to be integrated to assess the thyroid status and adjust the dosage appropriately.
