= Phytoecia insignita =

Scientific classification
- Domain: Eukaryota
- Kingdom: Animalia
- Phylum: Arthropoda
- Class: Insecta
- Order: Coleoptera
- Suborder: Polyphaga
- Infraorder: Cucujiformia
- Family: Cerambycidae
- Genus: Phytoecia
- Species: P. insignita

Binomial name
- Phytoecia insignita Chevrolat, 1854

Synonyms
- Phytoecia humeralis var. bethaniensis Pic, 1900; Helladia insignita (Chevrolat) Pic, 1903

Species of beetle

Phytoecia insignita is a species of beetle in the family Cerambycidae. It was described by Louis Alexandre Auguste Chevrolat in 1854. It is known from Palestine, Lebanon, Jordan and Syria. It feeds on Silybum marianum, and Centaurea hyalolepis.
