= C. Nash Herndon =

American geneticist (1916–1998)

Claude Nash Herndon Jr. (February 23, 1916 – March 29, 1998) was an American human geneticist who taught and conducted research at the Bowman Gray School of Medicine (now the Wake Forest School of Medicine) in Winston-Salem, NC. He was the school's senior associate dean for research and development for many years.

== Early life and education ==
Herndon was born in Greensboro, North Carolina, on February 23, 1916, to Claude Nash and Annie Lee (née Mann) Herndon. The younger Herndon received his undergraduate degree from Duke University in 1935 and his M.D. from Jefferson Medical College in 1939. His post-doctoral studies included work in the heredity clinic of the University of Michigan in Ann Arbor, Michigan, before joining the faculty at the Bowman Gray School of Medicine in 1942.

== Academic career ==
Herndon became the first director of N.C. Baptist Hospital's outpatient department in 1946; while also serving on the medical school's faculty in its Department of Medical Genetics, which had been founded by William Allan. Herndon later replaced Allan as head of the department after the latter's death. For most of Herndon's academic career, from 1966 to 1989, he was senior associate dean for research and development at the medical school. He served as president of the American Society of Human Genetics (ASHG) in 1955. From 1962 to 1963, he was the editor-in-chief of the American Journal of Human Genetics, the ASHG's official journal. His other service to academic and government boards included memberships on panels of the Atomic Energy Commission and National Institutes of Health, as well as the editorial board of Steadman's Medical Dictionary. He retired from Bowman Gray in 1989. A rare genetic disorder, Allan–Herndon–Dudley syndrome, is named after Allan, Herndon, and Florence C. Dudley.

== Eugenics ==
An outspoken advocate for genetics research to identify and curtail severe inherited diseases and birth defects, Herndon provided genetics counseling to the North Carolina government's eugenics sterilization program that later prompted the governor of North Carolina to apologize for it. North Carolina was one of 32 states with such programs. Herndon also served on many other academic and government health panels, including the genetics subcommittee of the American Association of Medical Colleges. In 1947, Herndon co-founded the Human Betterment League with Clarence Gamble and James G. Hanes, among others. In 1949, Herndon met with Wickliffe Draper, the head of the Pioneer Fund. The Fund, known for giving grants to researchers in support of its eugenicist and racialist agenda, subsequently funded some of Herndon's work. From 1953 to 1955, he was the president of the American Eugenics Society.

== Death ==
Herndon died on March 29, 1998, at the age of 82.
