= Tiratricol =

Chemical compound

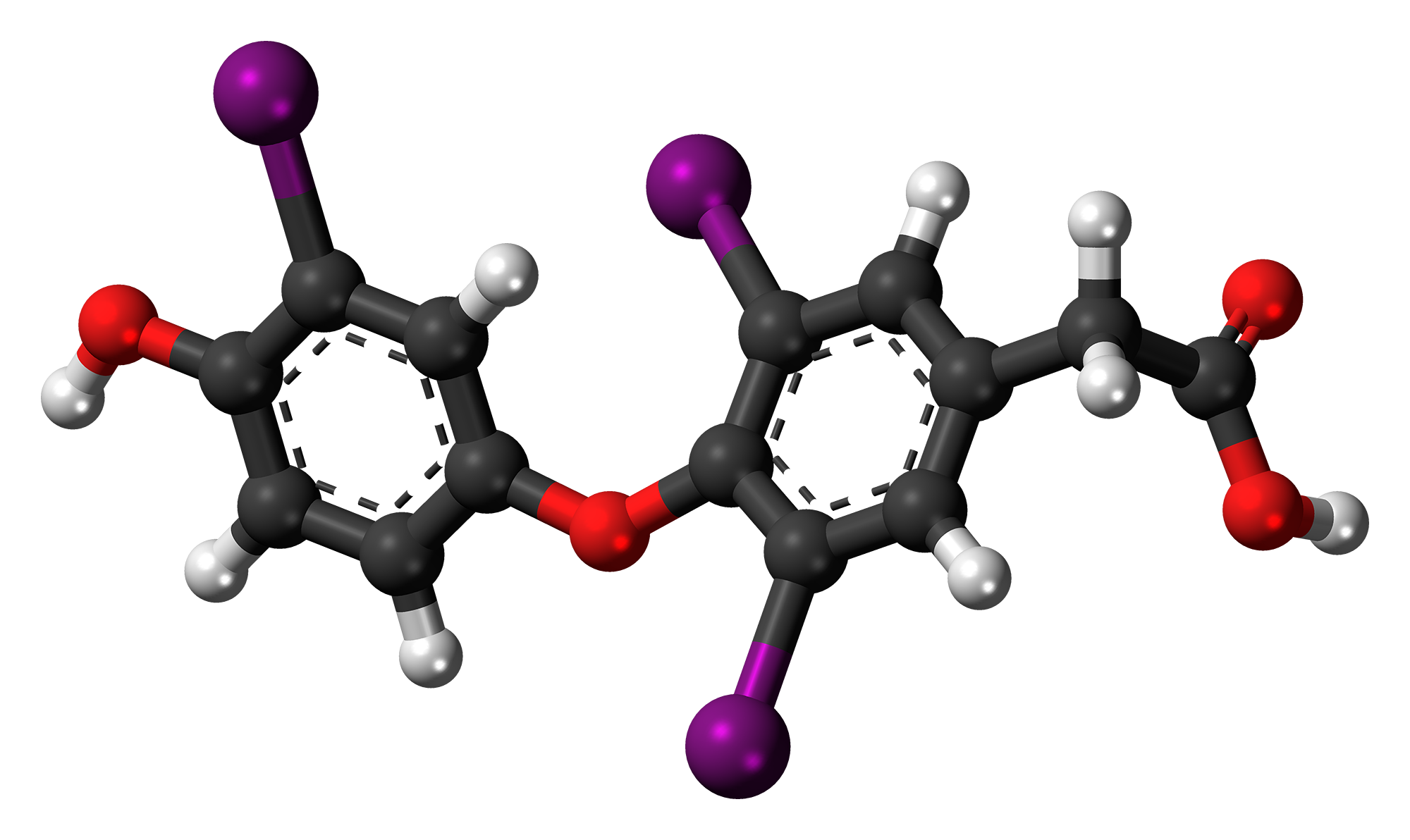

Clinical data
- Trade names: Téatrois, others
- Other names: 3,3',5-triiodothyroacetic acid; Triac
- AHFS/Drugs.com: International Drug Names
- License data: US DailyMed: Tiratricol
- Routes of administration: By mouth
- Drug class: Thyroid hormone
- ATC code: H03AA04 (WHO) D11AX08 (WHO)

Legal status
- Legal status: US: ℞-only; EU: Rx-only

Pharmacokinetic data
- Metabolism: Liver glucuronidation
- Excretion: Bile duct

Identifiers
- IUPAC name: [4-(4-hydroxy-3-iodophenoxy)-3,5-diiodophenyl]acetic acid
- CAS Number: 51-24-1; 1477-04-9
- PubChem CID: 5803; 23696732
- IUPHAR/BPS: 2637
- DrugBank: DB03604
- ChemSpider: 5598
- UNII: 29OQ9EU4R1; 3HK9045D54
- KEGG: D07214
- ChEBI: CHEBI:40021
- ChEMBL: ChEMBL41632
- CompTox Dashboard (EPA): DTXSID2045232
- ECHA InfoCard: 100.000.079

Chemical and physical data
- Formula: C_{14}H_{9}I_{3}O_{4}
- Molar mass: 621.935 g·mol^{−1}
- 3D model (JSmol): Interactive image; Interactive image
- SMILES: Ic2cc(Oc1c(I)cc(cc1I)CC(=O)O)ccc2O; [Na].O=C(O)CC1=CC(I)=C(OC2=CC=C(O)C(I)=C2)C(I)=C1
- InChI: InChI=1S/C14H9I3O4/c15-9-6-8(1-2-12(9)18)21-14-10(16)3-7(4-11(14)17)5-13(19)20/h1-4,6,18H,5H2,(H,19,20); Key:UOWZUVNAGUAEQC-UHFFFAOYSA-N; Key:DWQFOUDEHAIXPF-UHFFFAOYSA-N

Tiratricol, sold under the brand name Téatrois among others, is a thyroid hormone analogue. It is a thyroid hormone receptor agonist. Tiratricol is administered by mouth.

The most common side effects include excessive sweating, irritability, anxiety, nightmares, diarrhea, vomiting, rash, and excessive sweating.

Tiratricol was authorized for medical use in the European Union in February 2025, and approved for medical use in the United States in September 2026.

== Medical uses ==
Tiratricol is indicated for the treatment of peripheral thyrotoxicosis in people with monocarboxylate transporter 8 (MCT8) deficiency (Allan-Herndon-Dudley syndrome), from birth.

Thyrotoxicosis in MCT8 deficiency is caused by a mutation (change) in the gene that provides instructions for making a protein called MCT8. This protein normally transports the thyroid hormone T3 into cells of various tissues and organs, including those of the brain. Due to the gene mutation, MCT8 does not work properly and so T3 cannot enter the brain cells, causing problems with brain and muscle development. It also leads to a buildup of T3 in other parts of the body, causing problems due to too much thyroid hormone (hyperthyroidism). Tiratricol, is very similar to T3 but it does not need MCT8 to move in and out of cells. Tiratricol is therefore expected to enter the body’s cells in people with MCT8 deficiency and replace the missing T3 hormone. This helps restore normal thyroid hormone activity in the body and reduce symptoms of peripheral thyrotoxicosis.

MCT8 deficiency is a rare genetic disorder that primarily affects males. The condition is caused by a faulty gene that provides instructions for making the MCT8 transporter, a critical protein responsible for carrying thyroid hormone into the brain. Because thyroid hormone cannot cross the blood-brain barrier without the MCT8 transporter, the brain receives too little of this hormone, while excessive levels of the hormone build up in the bloodstream. Many people with MCT8 deficiency experience a range of debilitating effects, including the inability to walk or sit independently, absent or severely limited speech, intellectual disability, feeding difficulties and chronic stress on the heart and metabolism.

== History ==
The effectiveness of tiratricol was evaluated in two clinical studies in people ranging in age from infants to adults, including an international, multi-center, randomized, placebo-controlled trial (NCT05579327) and a longer-term open-label study. Across both studies, participants treated with tiratricol had reductions in excess thyroid hormone levels in the bloodstream and improvements in cardiovascular and metabolic symptoms impacted by thyroid levels, such as systolic blood pressure and heart rate.

== Society and culture ==
=== Legal status ===
Tiratricol was once an approved medication in Brazil, but its marketing authorization was suspended in 2003. Tiratricol is available in France for therapy of thyroid hormone resistance and adjuvant therapy of thyroid cancer.

In December 2024, the Committee for Medicinal Products for Human Use of the European Medicines Agency adopted a positive opinion, recommending the granting of a marketing authorization for the medicinal product Emcitate, intended for the treatment of MCT8 deficiency (Allan-Herndon-Dudley syndrome). The applicant for this medicinal product is Rare Thyroid Therapeutics International AB. Emcitate is a hybrid medicine of Téatrois, which has been authorized in France. Emcitate contains the same active substance as Téatrois but has a different indication. Tiratricol was authorized for medical use in the European Union in February 2025.

Tiratricol was approved for medical use in the United States in September 2026. The US Food and Drug Administration (FDA) granted the application for tiratricol orphan drug, rare pediatric disease, fast track, breakthrough therapy, and priority review designations. The FDA granted the approval of Emcitate to Egetis Therapeutics US.
