= Hepatoprotection =

Ability of a chemical substance to prevent liver damage

Hepatoprotection or antihepatotoxicity is the ability of a chemical substance to prevent damage to the liver. This is opposite to hepatotoxicity.

== Hepatoprotective molecules used in emergency medicine ==
- Acetylcysteine is considered the hepatoprotective drug of choice when treating an overdose of acetaminophen/paracetamol.
- Silymarin is given intravenously to treat poisoning from Amanita mushrooms according to the Santa Cruz protocol devised by Dr Todd Mitchell at UCSC.

== Herbs with potentially hepatoprotective constituents ==
- Astragalus membranaceus
- Brassica
- Silybum marianum, from which silymarin is derived
- Andrographis paniculata
