= Human Betterment League =

US eugenics organization

The Human Betterment League of North Carolina was created in 1947 on the initiative of hosiery businessman James G. Hanes of Winston-Salem, NC. He was joined by Clarence Gamble, a physician and heir to the Procter & Gamble fortune who previously founded Pathfinder International of Watertown, MA, an organization that promoted better family planning services in the United States and 70 other countries. Among the league's other founders were Alice Shelton Gray, a registered nurse; C. Nash Herndon, a genetics professor at the Bowman Gray School of Medicine of Wake Forest University in Winston-Salem; and A.M. Jordan, a professor of psychology at the University of North Carolina at Chapel Hill. The league has been criticized for promoting male and female sterilization for eugenic purposes. While the original focus of the organization was newspaper advertisements promoting sterilization and educating the public about the causes and prevention of inherited mental illnesses and handicaps, the league shifted its focus by the 1970s to promote birth control and genetic counseling. In 1984 it changed its name to the Human Genetics League, and it disbanded in 1988.
