= William Allan (geneticist) =

American physician and geneticist (1881–1943)

- Born: August 14, 1881; McDonogh School, Owings Mills, Maryland, U.S.
- Died: April 24, 1943 (aged 61); Winston-Salem, North Carolina, U.S.
- Known for: Allan–Herndon–Dudley syndrome
- Awards: The American Society of Human Genetics named its highest honor the William Allan Award
- Scientific career
- Fields: genetics
- Workplaces: Bowman Gray School of Medicine

William Allan (August 14, 1881 – April 24, 1943) was an American physician and geneticist who made pioneering studies in human genetics and hereditary diseases. He established the first course in human genetics, at the Bowman Gray School of Medicine, which is now a part of Wake Forest University Baptist Medical Center.

At Bowman Gray School of Medicine, the first department of medical genetics in the United States was established, and William Allan was appointed as the department's first chairman. Prior to this appointment, Allan had been in private practice in Charlotte, North Carolina, where he was nationally recognized for his early work in human and medical genetics. As chairman of this new department, William Allan also directed the nation's first research program in medical genetics, funded by the Carnegie Foundation.

The American Society of Human Genetics (ASHG) named its highest honor for Allan in 1961. The William Allan Award is presented annually by ASHG to recognize substantial and far-reaching scientific contributions to human genetics carried out over a sustained period of scientific inquiry and productivity. An award of $25,000 and an engraved medal are presented at the ASH annual meeting.

Allan died on April 24, 1943, at the age of 61.

== Allan–Herndon–Dudley syndrome ==
This condition, which occurs almost exclusively in males, disrupts development from before birth. It is named eponymously for William Allan, Florence C. Dudley, and C. Nash Herndon. Allan-Herndon-Dudley syndrome is a rare disorder of brain development that causes moderate to severe mental retardation and problems with movement.
