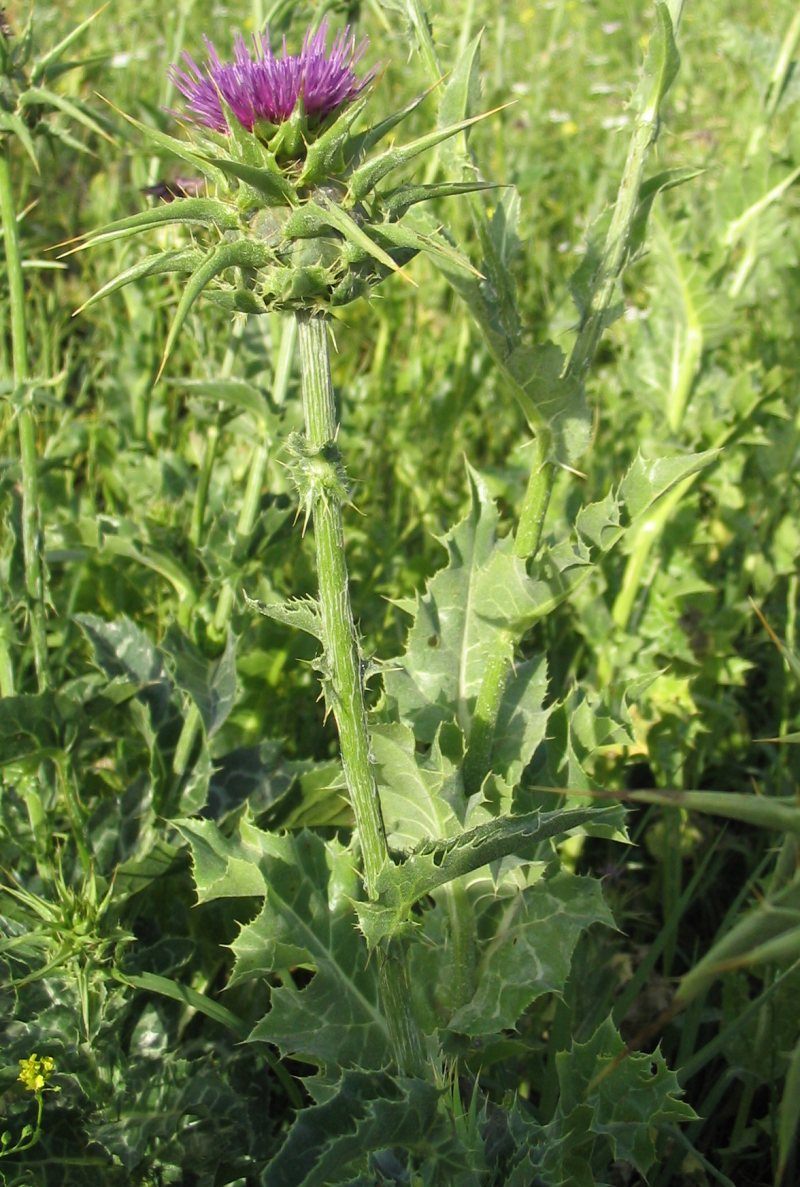
- Silybum marianum

Scientific classification
- Kingdom: Plantae
- Clade: Embryophytes
- Clade: Tracheophytes
- Clade: Angiosperms
- Clade: Eudicots
- Clade: Asterids
- Order: Asterales
- Family: Asteraceae
- Subfamily: Carduoideae
- Tribe: Cardueae
- Subtribe: Carduinae
- Genus: Silybum; Adans.

Type species
- Carduus marianus L.

Species
- Silybum eburneum; Silybum marianum; Silybum × gonzaloi

Synonyms
- Silybon Adans.

= Silybum =

Milk thistle

Genus of plants

Silybum (milk thistle) is a genus of two species of thistles in the family Asteraceae. The plants are native to the Mediterranean regions of Europe, North Africa, and the Middle East. One species has been introduced elsewhere, including in North America. The name "milk thistle" derives from a feature of the leaves, which are prominently banded with splashes of white. Historically, these milky bands were said to be Mother Mary's milk, and this is the origin of another common name, St. Mary's thistle. The most widespread species is Silybum marianum.

Claims have been made since ancient times that the active flavanoid-lignan (flavanolignan) group of constituents, called silymarin, contained only in the seed shell has liver-protective and regenerative properties, as well as antioxidant effects. Chemical, pharmacological, and safety research started in Germany in the 1950s.

== Description and classification ==
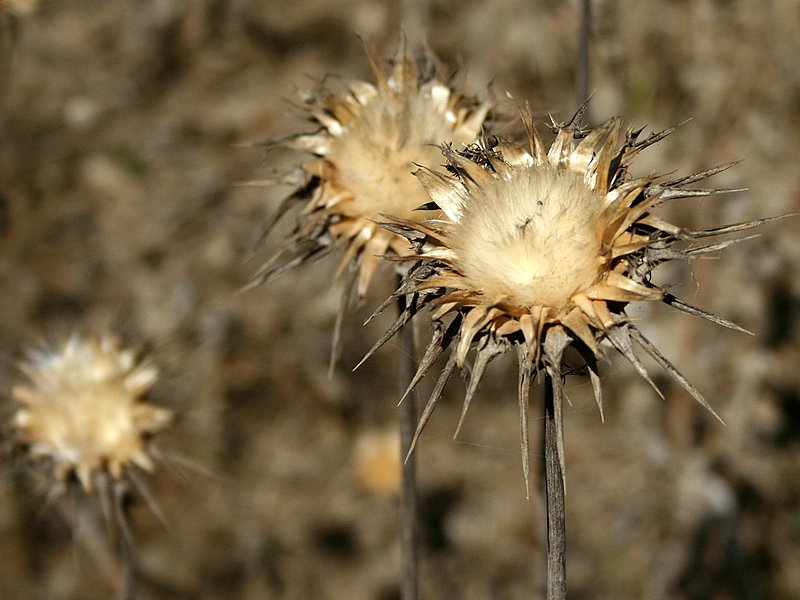
Dried thistle flowers at the end of summer

Members of this genus grow as annual or biennial plants. The erect stem is tall, branched and furrowed but not spiny. The large, alternate leaves are wavy-lobed, toothed and thorny, as in other genera of thistle. The lower leaves are sessile (attached to the stem without petiole). The upper leaves have a clasping base. They have large, disc-shaped pink-to-purple, rarely white, solitary flower heads at the end of the stem. The flowers consist of tubular florets. The phyllaries under the flowers occur in many rows, with the outer row with spine-tipped lobes and apical spines. The fruit is a black achene with a white pappus.

Species and varieties

- Silybum eburneum Coss. & Dur., known as the silver milk thistle, elephant thistle, or ivory thistle - Algeria, Morocco, Tunisia, Spain
  - Silybum eburneum Coss. & Dur. var. hispanicum
- Silybum marianum (L.) Gaertner, the blessed milk thistle, which has a large number of other common names, such as variegated thistle. - widespread across much of Europe, Asia, and North Africa from Norway and the Canary Islands to China and Maluku; naturalized in Australia, New Zealand, and the Americas

The two species hybridise naturally, the hybrid being known as Silybum × gonzaloi Cantó, Sánchez Mata & Rivas Mart. (S. eburneum var. hispanicum x S. marianum)

formerly included

- Silybum atriplicifolium - Synurus deltoides
- Silybum cernuum - Alfredia cernua

Silybum marianum is by far the more widely known species. Milk thistle is believed to give some remedy for liver diseases (e.g. viral hepatitis) and the extract, silymarin, is used in medicine. Mild gastrointestinal distress is the most common adverse event reported for milk thistle. The incidence is the same as for placebo. A laxative effect for milk thistle has also been reported infrequently.

== Claims of health benefits ==
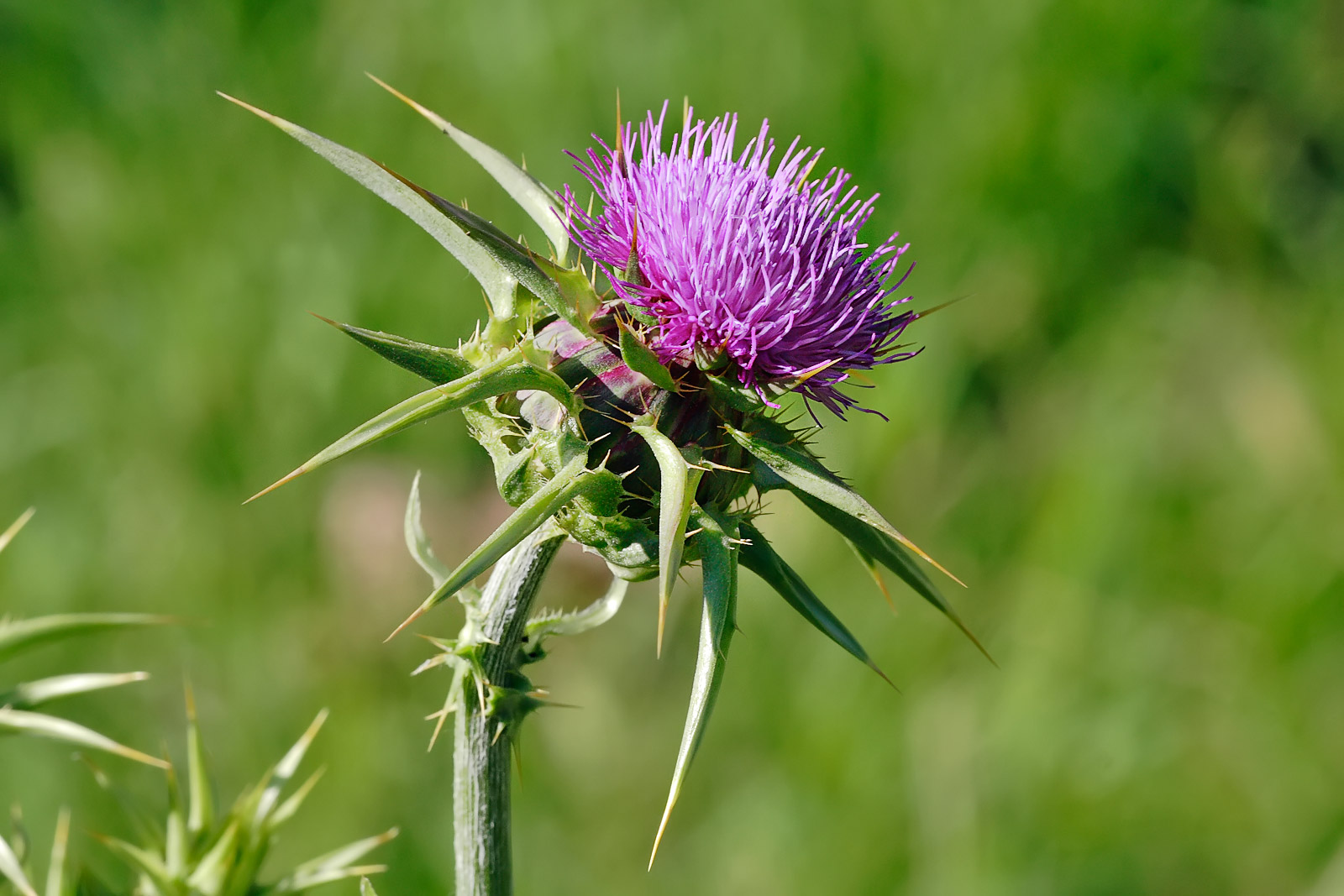
Flowerhead of Silybum marianum

For many centuries extracts of milk thistle have been recognized as "liver tonics." Milk thistle has been reported to have protective effects on the liver and to greatly improve its function. It is typically used to treat liver cirrhosis, chronic hepatitis (liver inflammation), toxin-induced liver damage including the prevention of severe liver damage from Amanita phalloides ('death cap' mushroom poisoning), and gallbladder disorders.

Reviews of the literature covering clinical studies of silymarin vary in their conclusions.

== See also ==
- Cnicus (Blessed thistle)
- Silybum marianum (Blessed milk thistle)
