= Silibinin =

Chemical compound

- Silibinin A and silibinin B structures

Clinical data
- AHFS/Drugs.com: International Drug Names
- Routes of administration: Oral and Intravenous
- ATC code: A05BA03 (WHO)

Identifiers
- IUPAC name: (2R,3R)-3,5,7-trihydroxy-2-[(2R*,3R*)-3-(4-hydroxy-3-methoxyphenyl)-2-(hydroxymethyl)-2,3-dihydrobenzo[b][1,4]dioxin-6-yl]chroman-4-one
- CAS Number: 1265089-69-7
- PubChem CID: 31553
- ChemSpider: 29263
- UNII: 4RKY41TBTF
- KEGG: D08515
- ChEBI: CHEBI:9144
- ChEMBL: ChEMBL9509
- CompTox Dashboard (EPA): DTXSID8026018
- ECHA InfoCard: 100.041.168

Chemical and physical data
- Formula: C_{25}H_{22}O_{10}
- Molar mass: 482.441 g·mol^{−1}
- 3D model (JSmol): Interactive image
- SMILES: O=C4c5c(O)cc(O)cc5O[C@H](c2ccc1O[C@@H]([C@H](Oc1c2)c3ccc(O)c(OC)c3)CO)[C@H]4O
- InChI: InChI=1S/C25H22O10/c1-32-17-6-11(2-4-14(17)28)24-20(10-26)33-16-5-3-12(7-18(16)34-24)25-23(31)22(30)21-15(29)8-13(27)9-19(21)35-25/h2-9,20,23-29,31H,10H2,1H3/t20-,23+,24-,25-/m1/s1; Key:SEBFKMXJBCUCAI-HKTJVKLFSA-N

Silibinin (INN), also known as silybin (both from Silybum, the generic name of the plant from which it is extracted), is the major active constituent of silymarin, a standardized extract of the milk thistle, containing a mixture of flavonolignans consisting of silibinin, isosilibinin, silychristin, silidianin, and others. Silibinin itself is a mixture of two diastereomers, silybin A and silybin B, in approximately equimolar ratio.

In some European countries, silibinin is available as part of the silymarin extract for oral use and as a water solution containing the dihemisuccinate disodium salt for intravenous injection. The extract is also available in other regions as a dietary supplement.

== Medical uses ==
=== Amanita poisoning ===
Intravenous silibinin (specifically the water-soluble form of silibinin-C-2',3-dihydrogen succinate disodium [silibinin dihemisuccinate disodium], trade name Legalon) is approved in Europe for Amanita poisoning. It is not approved in the US but can be obtained through the Expanded Access IND mechanism. This form is not found on the European Medicines Agency approved drug list, which means that if it is approved in Europe, it is only approved by some specific national agencies. It is not found on the list of Italian Medicines Agency.

=== Other hepatoprotective uses ===
In 2012, the dihemisuccinate disodium compound received Orphan Medicinal Product Designation for the prevention of recurrent hepatitis C in liver transplant recipients by the European Commission.

Oral products containing silibinin is approved in some EU countries as adjunctive therapy in chronic hepatitis and cirrhosis. The European Medicines Agency published an assessment report on oral forms of S. marianum fruit in 2018, in which the hepatoprotective use is listed as "well established" in Austria, Belgium, Croatia, Czechia, Estonia, France, Germany, Latvia, Lithuania, Spain, and Slovakia. In Italy, it is approved under the brand name Legalon as an ethanol extract of S. marianum.

There is limited evidence to support use of silibinin-containing products as a supplement in people with chronic liver disease. A systematic review and meta-analysis concluded that silymarin does not affect all-cause mortality in persons with cirrhosis, but it may help prevent liver-related mortality in those patients. There is mixed evidence for silibinin as an anti-inflammatory agent in alcohol-related liver disease or non-alcoholic fatty liver disease, and trials continue. There is little evidence to support a meaningful antiviral effect of milk thistle in chronic hepatitis C.

== Potential medical uses ==
Silibinin is under investigation to see whether it may have a role in cancer treatment (e.g., due to its inhibition of STAT3 signalling).

Silibinin has a number of potential mechanisms that could benefit the skin. These include chemoprotective effects from environmental toxins, anti-inflammatory effects, protection from UV-induced photocarcinogenesis, protection from sunburn, protection from UVB-induced epidermal hyperplasia, and DNA repair for UV-induced DNA damage (double strand breaks). Studies on mice demonstrate a significant protection on chronic unpredictable mild stress (CUMS)–induced depressive-like behavior on mice and increased cognition in aged rats as a result of consuming silymarin. There is research on if it helps treat Metabolic dysfunction–associated steatotic liver disease.

Due to its immunomodulatory, iron-chelating, and antioxidant properties, this herb has the potential to be used in beta-thalassemia patients who receive regular blood transfusions and suffer from iron overload.

== Pharmacology ==
Poor water solubility and bioavailability of silymarin led to the development of enhanced formulations. Silipide (trade name Siliphos, not to be confused with the water treatment compound of the same name, a glass-like polyphosphate containing sodium, calcium magnesium and silicate, formulated for the treatment of water problems), a complex of silymarin and phosphatidylcholine (a phospholipid in lecithin), is about 10 times more bioavailable than silymarin. An earlier study had concluded Siliphos to have 4.6 fold higher bioavailability. It has been also reported that silymarin inclusion complex with β-cyclodextrin is much more soluble than silymarin itself. There have also been prepared glycosides of silybin, which show better water solubility and even stronger hepatoprotective effect.

Silymarin, like other flavonoids, has been shown to inhibit P-glycoprotein-mediated cellular efflux. The modulation of P-glycoprotein activity may result in altered absorption and bioavailability of drugs that are P-glycoprotein substrates. It has been reported that silymarin inhibits cytochrome P450 enzymes and an interaction with drugs primarily cleared by P450s cannot be excluded.

== Toxicity ==
Silibinin and all the other compounds found in silymarin, especially silychristin, blocked the MCT8 transporter according to one in vitro study. There is no published clinical information showing silymarin or silibinin cause any thyroid problems. In fact, one clinical trial found that silymarin actually helped prevent thyroid suppression that is often caused by the drug lithium.

There is limited research on milk thistle and silymarin in pregnant humans. However, the one known clinical trial found only benefits, including but not limited to effectively treating intrahepatic cholestasis of pregnancy. Silymarin is also devoid of embryotoxic potential in animal models.

A phase I clinical trial in humans with prostate cancer designed to study the effects of high dose silibinin found 13 grams daily to be well tolerated in patients with advanced prostate cancer with asymptomatic liver toxicity (hyperbilirubinemia and elevation of alanine aminotransferase) being the most commonly seen adverse event.

== Biotechnology ==
Silymarin is usually extracted from Silybum marianum (milk thristle) fruit. In the water-soaked fruit, 41% of the mass is of the pericarp and 52% the mass is of the kernel (seed). Almost all of the flavolignan content is found in the pericarp. According to the EMA, acetone, ethanol, ethyl acetate, and methanol have been used for extraction.

Silymarin can be produced in callus and cell suspensions of Silybum marianum. Substituted pyrazinecarboxamides can be used as abiotic elicitors of flavolignan production.

== Biosynthesis ==
The biosynthesis of silibinin A and silibinin B is composed of two major parts, taxifolin and coniferyl alcohol.

Coniferyl alcohol is synthesized in milk thistle seed coat. Starting with the transformation of phenylalanine into cinnamic acid mediated by phenylalanine ammonia-lyase. Cinnamic acid will then go through two rounds of oxidation by trans-cinnamate 4-monooxygenase and 4-coumarate 3-hydroxylase to give caffeic acid. The meta position alcohol is methylated by caffeic acid 3-O-methyltransferase to produce ferulic acid. From ferulic acid, the production of coniferyl alcohol is carried out by 4-hydroxycinnamate CoA ligase, cinnamoyl CoA reductase, and cinnamyl alcohol dehydrogenase.

For taxifolin, its genes for the biosynthesis can be overexpressed in flowers as the transcription is light dependent. The production of taxifolin utilizes a similar pathway as for synthesizing p-coumaric acid followed by three times of carbon chain elongation with malonyl-CoA and cyclization by chalcone synthase and chalcone isomerase to yield naringenin. Through flavanone 3-hydroxylase and flavonoid 3'-monooxygenase, taxifolin is furnished.

To merge taxifolin and coniferyl alcohol, taxifolin can be translocated from the flower to the seed coat through symplast pathway. Both taxifolin and coniferyl alcohol will be oxidized by ascorbate peroxidase 1 to enable the single electron reaction to couple two fragments generating silybin (silibinin A + silibinin B).

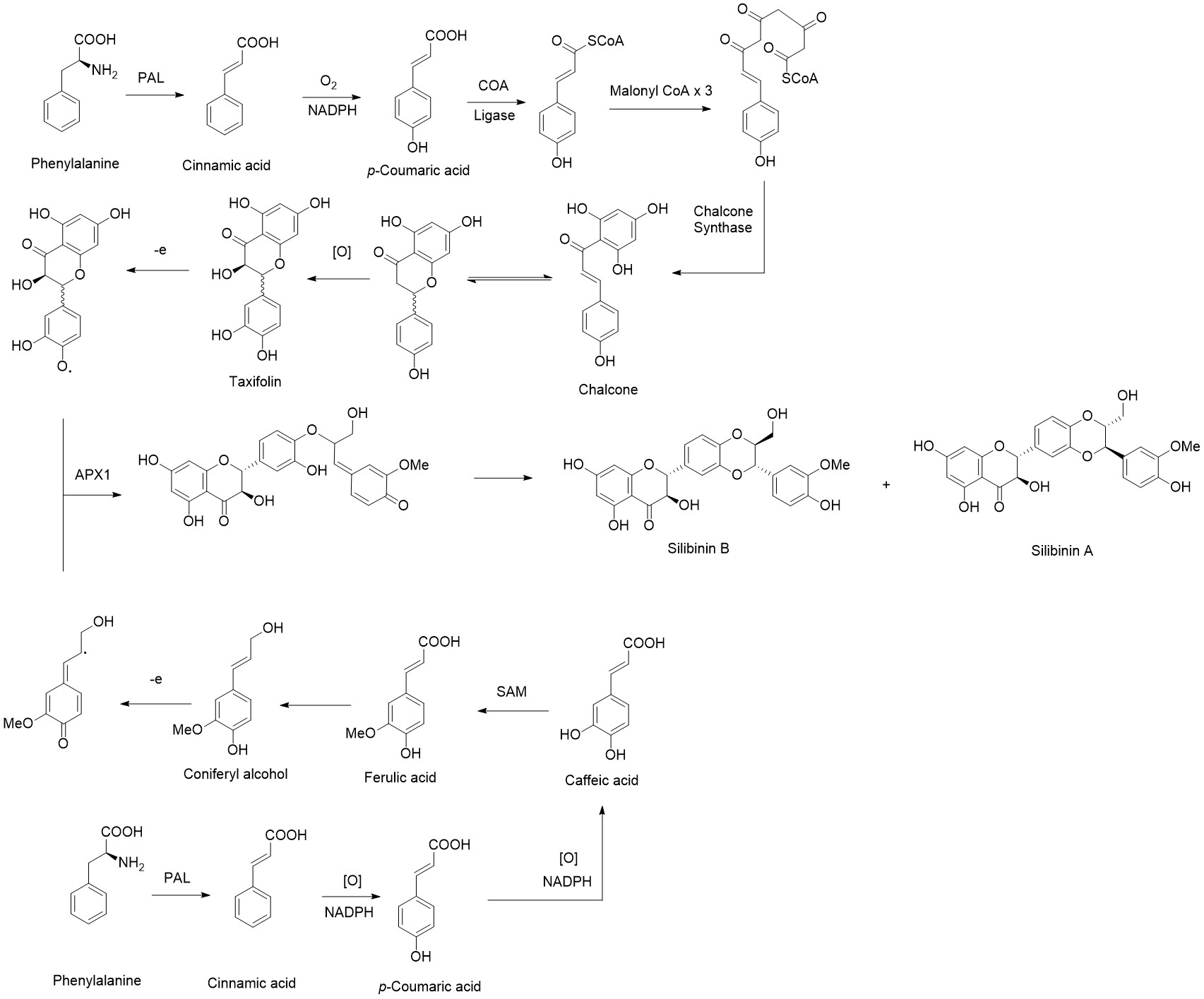
Biosynthesis of silybin (silibinin A and silibinin B)
