= Flavonolignan =

Flavonolignans are natural phenols composed of a part flavonoid and a part phenylpropane.

== Examples ==
Silibinin

Flavonolignans identified in Silybum marianum (milk thistle) silymarin complex include silibinin, silychristin, silydianin, dehydrosilybin, deoxysilycistin, deoxysilydianin, silandrin, silybinome, silyhermin and neosilyhermin and can be produced in vitro. Silibinin is found in the roots of S. marianum while silyamandin can be found in the fruit.

Hydnocarpin can be found naturally in Onopordon corymbosum and can be synthesised.

Scutellaprostin A, B, C, D, E and F can be isolated from Scutellaria prostrata and can also be synthesized.

Hydnowightin can be isolated from Hydnocarpus wightianus seeds.

Three flavonolignans derived from the flavone tricin have been isolated from the herb Avena sativa.

Palstatin has been isolated from the Amazon tree Hymeneae palustris.

Salcolin A and salcolin B can be found in Salsola collina.

Rhodiolin, the product of the oxidative coupling of coniferyl alcohol with the 7,8-dihydroxy grouping of the flavonol herbacetin, can be found in the rhizome of Rhodiola rosea.

== Glycosides ==
The flavonolignans tricin 4'-O-(erythro-beta-guaiacylglyceryl) ether and tricin 4'-O-(threo-beta-guaiacylglyceryl) ether can be isolated together with their 7-O-glucosides in the leaves of Hyparrhenia hirta.

== Research ==
Research in 2022, concluded that flavonolignans "reduce the virulence of antibiotic-resistant bacterial strains".
