= Clarence Gamble =

American medical doctor

Clarence James Gamble (January 10, 1894 – July 15, 1966) was an American medical doctor and the heir of the Procter and Gamble soap company fortune. He was an advocate of birth control and eugenics, and he founded Pathfinder International.

== Biography ==
In 1929 Gamble gave $5,000 to open a maternal health clinic in Cincinnati, Ohio.

In January 1914, on his 21st birthday, he received his first million dollars. As the grandson of James Gamble, co-founder of Procter & Gamble, he was an heir to family money, which came with a stipulation that at least 10 percent was to be devoted to charitable giving. He later increased this to 30 percent.

After graduating from Princeton University in 1914 and Harvard Medical School in 1920, Gamble began his residency at Massachusetts General Hospital. In 1923, he secured an apprenticeship with Alfred Newton Richards, director of the Department of Pharmacology at the University of Pennsylvania, but he did not work with Richards as his plans were interrupted by the death of his father, David Berry Gamble.

On June 21, 1924, Gamble married Sarah Merry Bradley. In October 1925, he introduced himself to Dr. Robert Latou Dickinson, who in 1923 had established the National Committee on Maternal Health.

In January 1929, Gamble's mother died. He wanted to create a memorial for his mother in Cincinnati. Her gynecologist, Elizabeth Campbell, told him that his mother had wanted a maternal health clinic in Cincinnati. Gamble became a member of Dickinson's Committee on Maternal Health and through it made his first “pathfinder” grant. With that $5,000, Campbell opened the Cincinnati Maternal Health Clinic in November 1929 and began dispensing information on birth control to Cincinnati women. At that time, few other birth control clinics existed, other than one in Cleveland, one in Chicago and Margaret Sanger's Clinical Research Bureau in New York City.

Around this time, a college friend from Princeton, Stuart Mudd, became professor of microbiology at the University of Pennsylvania. Mudd and his wife Emily formed the Southeastern Pennsylvania Birth Control League and opened a birth control clinic in Philadelphia.

In the early decades of the 20th century, the diaphragm was used with spermicidal jelly, and the league needed to determine which contraceptive jellies, among the many advertised, were effective. Gamble did some research in a lab at the University of Pennsylvania, and soon he and Sarah were actively supporting the league and the clinic with funding.

By 1930, Gamble was chairman of the board of the Philadelphia Maternal Health Centers. He sought a simpler method of contraception, one that did not require a costly doctor's visit as fitting a diaphragm did, and that was inexpensive and immediately available.

In January 1964, Gamble was diagnosed with leukemia.

== Expansion ==
In 1930 he hired Elsie Wulkop, a social worker whom he had known at Massachusetts General Hospital, to work in Detroit. During the next four years she helped to open clinics in Michigan, Indiana, Missouri, Kansas, and Nebraska.

In the late 1930s Gamble urged the unification of Margaret Sanger's Clinical Birth Control Research Bureau with the competing American Birth Control League. In 1939, the two organizations became the Birth Control Federation of America.

He funded early research for the Southeastern Pennsylvania League's work to identify effective spermicidal jellies. After the American Medical Association (AMA) said in 1937 that contraception merited a physician's attention, Gamble's research became the basis of the AMA Standards Program for testing contraceptives—which was the measure of the AMA for endorsing contraceptive products, and finally the basis for state and federal legislation.

In 1937, he began to fund education and distribution of birth control supplies through the North Carolina State Board of Health, making North Carolina the first state to incorporate birth control in a public health program. This influenced five nearby states—South Carolina, Alabama, Florida, Mississippi, and Virginia—to incorporate birth control into their public health programs.

In the 1930s, Gamble was president of the Pennsylvania Birth Control Federation; a vice-presidents and member of the Executive Committee of the Board of the American Birth Control League; medical field director of Margaret Sanger's Birth Control Clinical Research Bureau, and treasurer and member of the board of Robert Dickinson's National Committee on Maternal Health. In 1938, Gamble left Philadelphia and the University of Pennsylvania and moved near Boston, Massachusetts and funded eight field workers at new community-supported birth control clinics in Montana, Tennessee, the East Coast, and the Midwest. During this decade, he and his fieldworkers helped establish birth control clinics in 40 cities in 14 American states.

In 1949 Gamble offered Frank W. Notestein, director of the Office of Population Research at Princeton and future president of the Population Council, a small sum to translate birth control pamphlets into Japanese. This led to correspondence with Dr. Yoshio Koya, director of Japan's National Institute of Public Health.

At that time, half of Japanese pregnancies were aborted. Koya planned a field study to determine whether the Japanese would use contraception if it was available. Gamble donated $700.

Koya's Three Village study began fieldwork in November 1950 and by May 1951 showed that 92 percent of the Japanese population wanted contraception. Koya gave the data to the minister of welfare, and in 1952, the Japanese government allotted funds to put free birth control clinics into all Japanese health centers.

In 1951, Gamble funded exploratory work in the Punjab state of India. The resulting India-Harvard-Ludhiana or Khanna study examined the use of contraceptives by Indians in that region and continued for 17 years, generating some three dozen articles, a book, and a monograph.

== Tension and disagreement ==
As the field expanded, tensions arose among Planned Parenthood Federation of America, Inc. (PPFA), International Planned Parenthood Federation (IPPF), the Population Council, and Clarence Gamble. Lady Bengal Rama Rau, chair of IPPF and leader of its India Ocean region, and Helena Wright, medical director of IPPF, said they were sensitive to the years of oppression waged by white colonists. Rama Rau, Wright, and IPPF said that women of whatever color deserved the best that Western medicine could offer—in this case birth control provided by a fitted diaphragm after an exam by a gynecologist.

Gamble said that health workers could be trained to fit diaphragms, which would be using different standards of care for women in the developing world than for women in the developed world. India had a high patient-to-physician ratio, hindering the ability of physicians to meet patient demand for diaphragms.

IPPF maintained that white Europeans should not go uninvited into foreign countries to offer birth control information.

At the 1955 Tokyo IPPF conference, which Gamble had helped to organize in committee beginning in 1953, and to which he contributed $3,000, he was refused admittance to most of the conference sessions.

At the celebratory dinner for Margaret Sanger on the last night of the IPPF's Tokyo conference, Gamble was awarded the Margaret Sanger Trophy, a silver loving cup 18 inches tall, inscribed, “Clarence J. Gamble, the Benefactor of the Family Planning Movement in Japan.”

Gamble worked closely with and financially supported Dickinson's National Committee on Maternal Health until Dickinson's death in 1950, and gave both financial support and time to Margaret Sanger's Clinical Birth Control Research Bureau.

After the IPPF Japan conference, Gamble, accompanied by his oldest son, Richard, visited doctors who had agreed to test the simple methods. Their results indicated a reduction from 70 to 20 pregnancies per 100 couples per year. On that first Asia trip, Clarence and Richard promoted birth control in 13 countries, including Singapore, Hong Kong, and Burma, and assisted local leaders in forming family planning associations in Pakistan, Bangladesh, Italy, Sri Lanka, Thailand, and Japan.

From 1954 through 1956, Gamble visited over a dozen countries on each four- or five-month trip.

== Eugenics and forced sterilization ==
Clarence Gamble and James Hanes were founding members of the Human Betterment League of North Carolina in 1947. The league supported programs of forced sterilization of both men and women, mostly poor, of assumed low IQ, and predominantly African-American, without their consent, with the goal of reducing the state's welfare burden and improving the gene pool. The program ended in 1977; the state government apologized publicly in 2002. In 2011, Governor Bev Perdue advocated for financial restitution to be made to 7,600 victims.

== Pathfinder Fund ==
In addition to paying the salaries of visiting nurses and health workers to staff the clinics and office workers to manage offices, Gamble paid for and distributed print materials: posters in native languages, comic-book-style pamphlets, flyers, reprints of scientific articles, booklets and books, and contraception manuals. He provided anatomical models of the human pelvis, purchased film strips and movies, and supported their production.

As he had when hiring field workers to open clinics in the United States, Gamble chose women in their 50s to be his envoys.

Gamble and his fieldworkers adapted written materials and tailored their social interactions to local culture. In Puerto Rico, visiting nurses saw mothers at homes.

Gamble advocated simple methods, allowing people to decide for themselves the number of children they wanted, and offered family planning methods that could be used without intensive medical supervision. However, he also provided the diaphragm and jelly when it was appropriate or requested.

In 1957, at the suggestion of his attorney son-in-law, Lionel Epstein, husband of his oldest child, Sally, his philanthropic activity was incorporated into the new Pathfinder Fund, and Gamble was elected president by the board of directors on February 27, 1957. In 1991, The Pathfinder Fund was renamed Pathfinder International.

In a typical report from 1959, The Pathfinder Fund listed its activities and expenditures: the fund was paying the salary of a nurse in Mombasa; a nurse in Burma; a nurse in Maadi, Egypt; supplemental salaries for nurses in Taiwan; part-time salary for secretary of the Associazione Italiana Per L'Educazione Demografica; salaries for three workers in Colombo, Sri Lanka; salaries for persons working for the family planning associations of Thailand and Bangladesh, both under supervision of Mrs. Roots; consultation fee for Dr. Luigi DeMarchi, (who, with his wife Maria Luisa DeMarchi, were crusaders for the legalization of birth control in Roman Catholic Italy); salary for a nurse in Hong Kong, who worked in an area of "hillside shacks beyond the ends of roads," occupied by refugees; and in August, supplementary payments of approximately $5 per month were allowed for nurses in Taiwan because the nurses must live in the village "where they were exposed to snakes, barking dogs, and sleeping behind doors with no locks." The Margaret Sanger Research Bureau was funded for a study of foam tablets, the salary of an intern, half the salary of the head of their research program, and general expenses. Miscellaneous grants were made to Princeton, PPFA, and local community groups.

After founding The Pathfinder Fund in 1957, Gamble took fewer and shorter world trips. In the 1950s and early 1960s, his fieldworkers visited 60 countries in Africa, Asia, and South America; family planning associations and clinics we're established in at least 30 countries, while groundwork was laid in others.

Just as The Pathfinder Fund was being incorporated, Gregory Pincus set up his first clinical trial of the first contraceptive pill in Puerto Rico. Gamble drew on his contacts there from the 1930s, when he had rescued Puerto Rico's birth control program. At that time, the Franklin D. Roosevelt administration had eliminated federal support for a chain of clinics due to pressure from Catholic bishops, and Gamble had provided the support to keep them going. Two decades later, he organized additional trials of the Pill with Dr. Adaline Satterthwaite at the Ryder Memorial Hospital in Humacao, and in 1961, Dr. Satterthwaite began testing the intrauterine device (IUD) as well.

Though Gamble supported trials of the pill, its drawbacks included its daily dose requirement and relatively high cost. The IUD was both simple to use and low cost, requiring one-time insertion of an inexpensive piece of plastic. Dr. Satterthwaite demonstrated its safety, and Gamble began mailing out these plastic loops. In Korea, where as many as 2,000 babies were abandoned yearly in the Seoul streets, the government welcomed this new method of practical birth control. By October 1962, Gamble had sent almost 3,000 loops to Korea.

The Population Council wanted complete control of IUD trials and distribution, but Gamble opened his own manufacturing plant in Hong Kong. By 1964, Gamble was receiving reports on the IUD from 72 doctors in 32 countries. At the time of his death in 1966, The Pathfinder Fund was delivering IUDs to 504 doctors in 74 countries.

Despite sharp disagreements, Gamble encouraged the clinics and family planning associations that he funded and his fieldworkers opened to become members of PPFA or IPPF, which most did.

== Papers ==
Gamble's papers are kept at Harvard's Countway Library of Medicine
