= Monocarboxylate transporter 8 =

Protein-coding gene in the species Homo sapiens

SLC16A2

Identifiers
- Aliases: SLC16A2, DXS128, DXS128E, MCT 7, MCT 8, MCT7, MCT8, MRX22, XPCT, AHDS, solute carrier family 16 member 2
- External IDs: OMIM: 300095; MGI: 1203732; GeneCards: SLC16A2

Gene location (Human)
Chr.	X chromosome (human)
Band	Xq13.2	Start	74,421,493 bp
Band	Xq13.2	End	74,533,917 bp

Gene location (Mouse)
Chr.	X chromosome (mouse)
Band	X D|X 46.29 cM	Start	102,741,020 bp
Band	X D|X 46.29 cM	End	102,865,589 bp
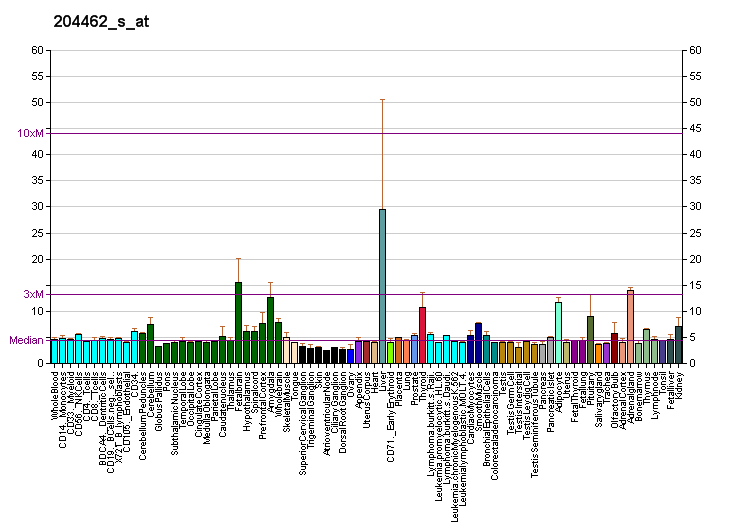
RNA expression pattern
Bgee	Human / Mouse (ortholog); Top expressed in: right adrenal gland; right adrenal cortex; right lobe of liver; left adrenal gland; left adrenal cortex; ganglionic eminence; ventricular zone; anterior pituitary; stromal cell of endometrium; gallbladder / Top expressed in: choroid plexus of fourth ventricle; Epithelium of choroid plexus; left lobe of liver; right kidney; tail of embryo; ligament; human kidney; internal carotid artery; proximal tubule; genital tubercle; More reference expression data
BioGPS	More reference expression data
Gene ontology
Molecular function	symporter activity; monocarboxylic acid transmembrane transporter activity; transporter activity; thyroid hormone transmembrane transporter activity
Cellular component	integral component of membrane; integral component of plasma membrane; membrane; plasma membrane
Biological process	monocarboxylic acid transport; thyroid hormone transport; transmembrane transport; sodium-independent organic anion transport
Sources:Amigo / QuickGO
Orthologs
Databases	NCBI: entry; OMA: entry
Species	Human	Mouse
Entrez	6567	20502
Ensembl	ENSG00000147100	ENSMUSG00000033965
UniProt	P36021	O70324
RefSeq (mRNA)	NM_006517	NM_009197
RefSeq (protein)	NP_006508; NP_006508.2	NP_033223
Location (UCSC)	Chr X: 74.42 – 74.53 Mb	Chr X: 102.74 – 102.87 Mb
PubMed search
- Wikidata
View/Edit Human	View/Edit Mouse

Monocarboxylate transporter 8 (MCT8) is an active transporter protein that in humans is encoded by the SLC16A2 gene.

== Function ==
MCT8 actively transports a variety of iodo-thyronines including the thyroid hormones T_{3} and T_{4}.

== Clinical significance ==
A genetic disorder (discovered in 2003 and 2004) is caused by mutation in the transporter of thyroid hormone, MCT8, also known as SLC16A2, is believed to be account for a significant fraction of the undiagnosed neurological disorders (usually resulting in hypotonic/floppy infants with delayed milestones). This genetic defect was known as Allan–Herndon–Dudley syndrome (since 1944) without knowing its actual cause. It has been shown mutated in cases of X-linked leukoencephalopathy. Some of the symptoms for this disorder as are follows: normal to slightly elevated TSH, elevated T_{3} and reduced T_{4} (ratio of T_{3}/T_{4} is about double its normal value). Normal looking at birth and for the first few years, hypotonic (floppy), in particular difficulty to hold the head, possibly difficulty to thrive, possibly with delayed myelination (if so, some cases are reported with an MRI pattern similar to Pelizaeus–Merzbacher disease, known as PMD), possibly with decreased mitochondrial enzyme activities, possibly with fluctuating lactate level. Patients have an alert face, a limited IQ, patients may never talk/walk, 50% need feeding tube, patients have a normal life span. This disease can be ruled out with a simple TSH/T_{4}/T_{3} thyroid test.

== Model organisms ==
=== Zebrafish ===
A knockout zebrafish line was generated in 2014 using the zinc-finger nuclease (ZFN)-mediated targeted gene editing system. Similar to human patients, the zebrafish larvae exhibited neurological and behavioral deficiencies. They demonstrated reduced locomotor activity, altered myelin-related genes and neuron-specific deficiencies in circuit formation.

=== Xenopus ===
Expression of mct8 has been characterised in Xenopus laevis and Xenopus tropicalis.

== See also ==
- Solute carrier family
