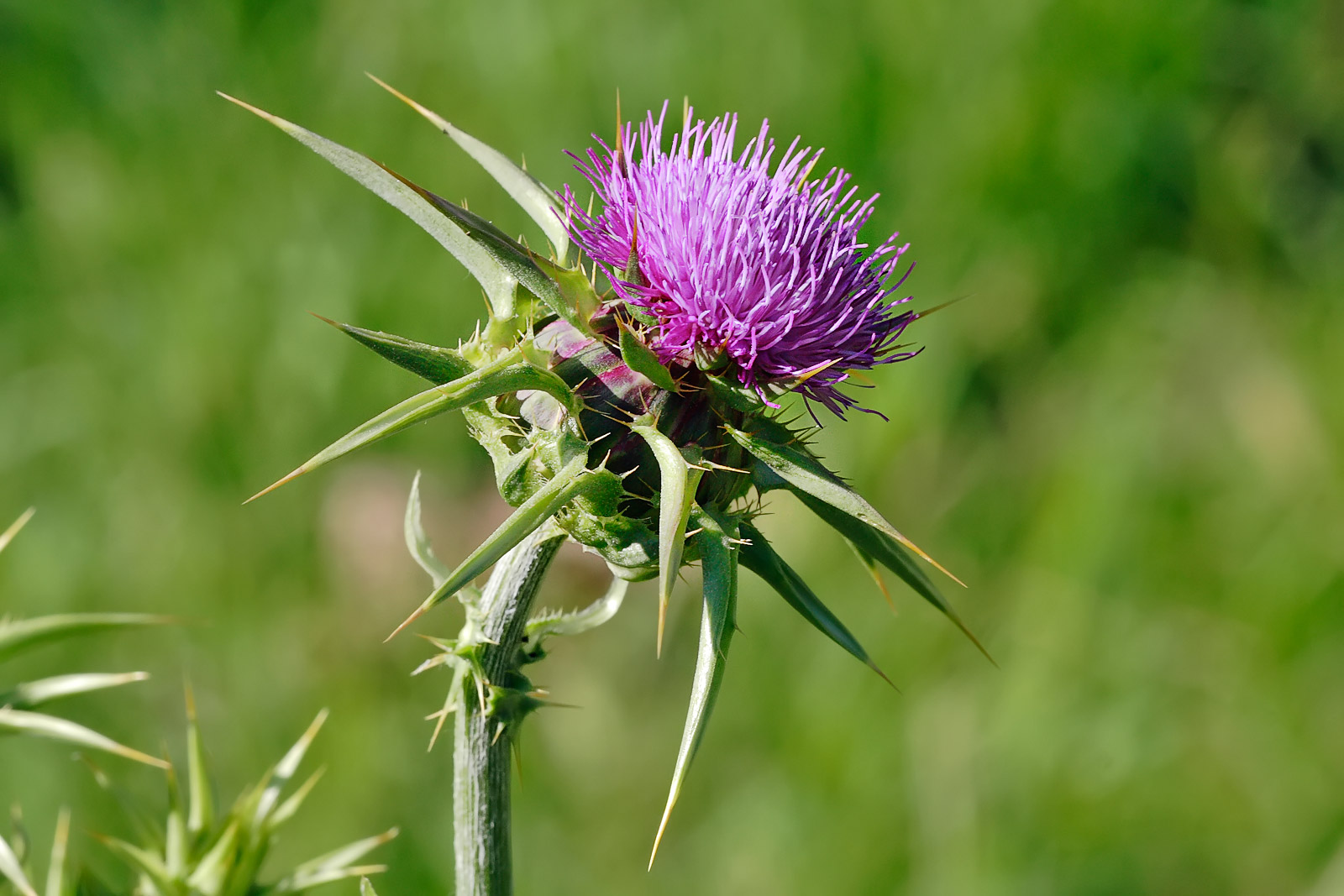

Conservation status
- Least Concern (IUCN 3.1)

Scientific classification
- Kingdom: Plantae
- Clade: Tracheophytes
- Clade: Angiosperms
- Clade: Eudicots
- Clade: Asterids
- Order: Asterales
- Family: Asteraceae
- Genus: Silybum
- Species: S. marianum

Binomial name
- Silybum marianum (L.) Gaertn.

Synonyms
- Carduus marianus L.

= Silybum marianum =

Milk thistle

Species of plant

Silybum marianum is a species of thistle. It has various common names including milk thistle, blessed milkthistle, Marian thistle, Mary thistle, Saint Mary's thistle, Mediterranean milk thistle, variegated thistle and Scotch thistle (not to be confused with Onopordum acanthium or Cirsium vulgare). This species is an annual or biennial plant of the family Asteraceae. This fairly typical thistle has red to purple flowers and shiny pale green leaves with white veins. Once native from Southern Europe through Asia, it has spread throughout the world.

== Description ==
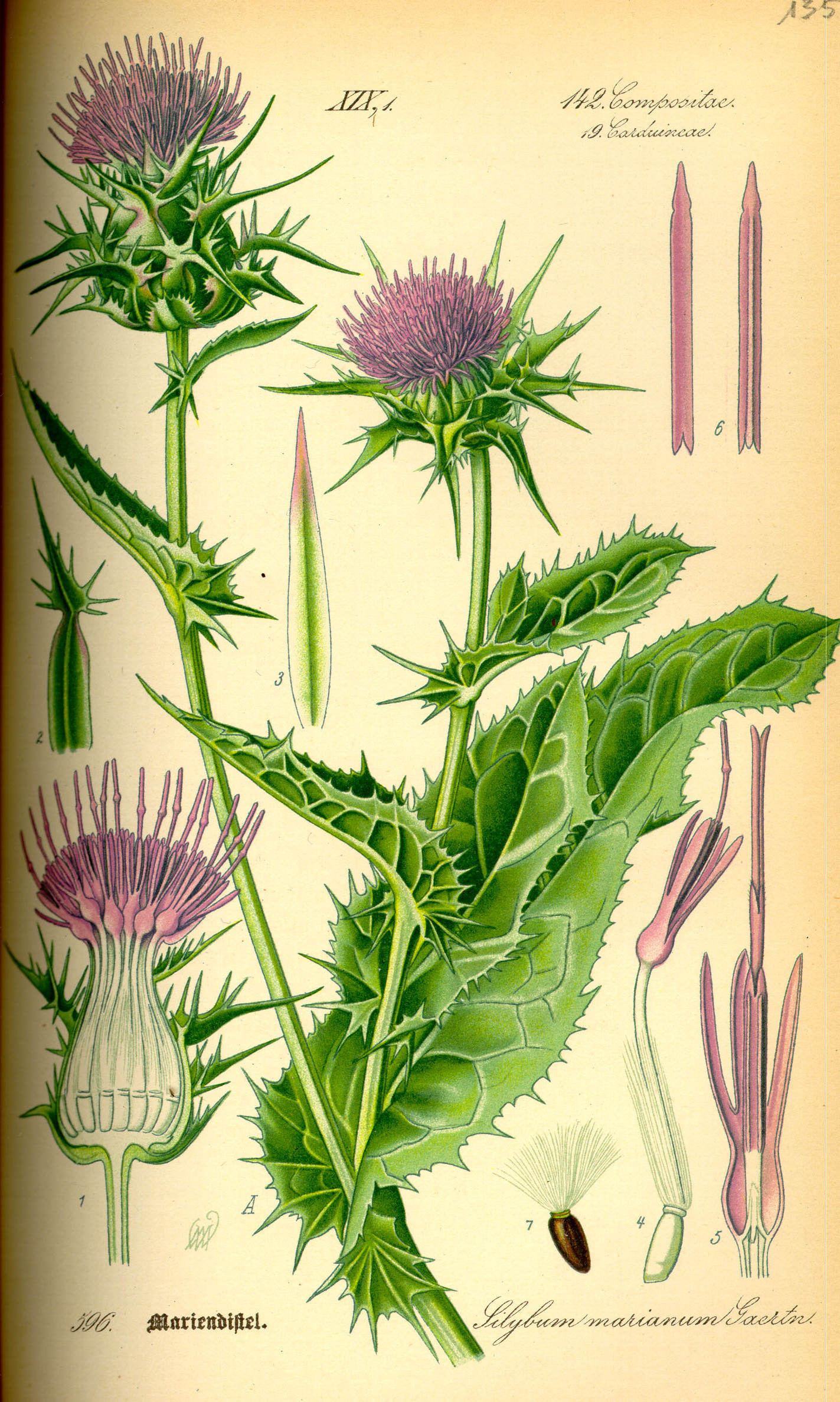
Illustration

Milk thistle is an upright herb that can grow to be 30 to 200 cm (12 to 79 in) tall and has an overall conical shape. The approximate maximum base diameter is 160 cm (63 in). The stem is grooved and may be covered in a light cottony fuzz. The largest specimens have hollow stems.

The leaves are oblong to lanceolate and 15–60 cm (6–23 1/2 in) long and typically pinnately lobed, with spiny edges like most thistles. They are hairless, shiny green, with milk-white veins.

The flower heads are 4 to 12 cm long and wide, of red-purple colour. They flower from June to August in the North or December to February in the Southern Hemisphere. The flower head is surround by bracts which are hairless, with triangular, spine-edged appendages, tipped with a stout yellow spine.

The fruits are black achenes with a simple long white pappus, surrounded by a yellow basal ring. A long pappus acts as a "parachute", supporting seed dispersal by wind.

== Distribution and habitat ==
Silybum marianum is native from around the Mediterranean and much of Europe to Central Asia and India; in Africa it reaches as far south as Ethiopia. It is possibly native near the coast of southeast England. S. marianum has been widely introduced outside its natural range, for example into North America, Hawaii, Australia, New Zealand, and Colombia where it is considered an invasive weed. It also spreads invasively in almost all of Europe as a consequence of field cultivation.

Silybum marianum establishes itself in sunny, warm ruderal meadows in regularly disturbed places such as rubble deposits, at the foot of south-exposed walls or villages and on urban fallow land or on cattle pastures. However, it does not prefer dry, stony soils.

Milk thistle has been potentially observed to modify fire regimes in its invasive range. Its invasion into new habitats may also be encouraged by fire.

== Cultivation ==
Milk thistle is an adaptive crop with low requirements. It is mainly cultivated as a medicinal plant but it is also sometimes used as a food source. It's mainly cultivated in Europe but also in Asia and North America. Milk thistle is a biennial plant, it is normally grown as an annual plant, which simplifies cultivation. When the main requirements of the plant are met, then the milk thistle will blossom in the first year.

Milk thistle has low soil nutrient requirements and is drought resistant. The optimal pH ranges from 5.5 to 7.6, but a wide range is acceptable. The seeds are directly sown into the soil with a sowing depth of 1 to 1.5 cm. For germination, a minimal temperature of 2 °C (36 °F) is needed. Sowing can be done in Autumn or in Spring, depending on the climate conditions. Row spacing is between 40 and 75 cm with a plant space of about 25 cm in the rows. Fertilization is not necessarily needed because of the low nutrient requirements. A standard fertilization rate of 50 kg nitrogen, 30 kg phosphorus and 60 kg potassium per hectare is applied before sowing, to improve yields. Harvest normally occurs in July or August. Since the flower heads do not ripen evenly, optimal harvest time is about a fortnight after 50% of the flower heads are dry. For harvesting a common cereal combine harvester can be used. In Poland, average yields are 1230 kg per ha with an average silymarin content of 26.5 kg per ha.

== Chemistry ==
Silibinin

Traditional milk thistle extract is made from the seeds (technically the whole fruit), which contain approximately 4–6% silymarin. The extract consists of about 65–80% silymarin (a flavonolignan complex) and 20–35% fatty acids, including linoleic acid. In the water-soaked fruit, 41% of the mass is of the pericarp and 52% the mass is of the kernel (actual seed). Almost all of the flavolignan content is found in the pericarp.

Silymarin is a complex mixture of polyphenolic molecules, including seven closely related flavonolignans (silybin A, silybin B, isosilybin A, isosilybin B, silychristin, isosilychristin, silydianin) and one flavonoid (taxifolin). Silibinin, a semipurified fraction of silymarin, is primarily a mixture of 2 diastereoisomers, silybin A and silybin B, in a roughly 1:1 ratio. More complete extraction of flavonolignans from the fruit is a topic of ongoing research.

== Toxicity ==
Milk thistle based supplements have been measured to have the highest mycotoxin concentrations of up to 37 mg/kg when compared to various plant-based dietary supplements.

Use of milk thistle may cause stomach upset and produce allergic reactions in some people. There is a documented case of a 29-year-old employee at an organic food production facility who was found to have an isolated allergy to milk thistle. The allergy developed through inhalation, and clinical symptoms (runny nose, sneezing, watery and burning eyes, and wheezing) did not appear until a few years after the period of direct work involving the packaging of ground milk thistle fruit. The patient reported that he had never previously consumed milk thistle in the form of infusions or dietary supplements. The patient described was also found to have an allergy to Eragrostis tef, wasp venom, and hypersensitivity to certain raw fruits and vegetables. It is anticipated that the growing popularity of milk thistle-based products in the food and pharmaceutical industries may lead to more frequent recognition of hypersensitivity to this plant. Eyelid edema, ocular pruritus, dry eye, diplopia, and blurred vision are among the reported complications based on registered side effects in the WHO global database of adverse drug reactions.

=== Leaf toxicity ===
Because of nitrate content, the leaf has been found to be toxic to cattle and sheep. When potassium nitrate is eaten by ruminants, the bacteria in the animal's stomach breaks the chemical down, producing nitrite ions. Nitrite ions then combine with hemoglobin to produce methemoglobin, blocking the transport of oxygen. The result is a form of oxygen deprivation.

== Uses ==
Although potentially allergenic, the leaves and stems can be gathered ahead of bloom, the spines removed, and boiled with salt. The roots are edible raw or roasted and the flower head can be cooked like globe artichoke.

Silymarin is extracted from the milk thistle seeds (technically the fruits) and available as a standardized extract. In 2018, the European Medicines Agency published an assessment report on the oral use of milk thistle fruit and its extracts in EU states. It finds that there is a "well-established use" of hepatoprotection approved by 11 countries and a "traditional use" of dyspeptic complaints in 4 countries. EMA has also published a monograph on this herbal substance.

Although milk thistle "seed" (fruit) has been used in traditional medicine for centuries, there is no clinical evidence that it has any medicinal effect as of the year 2020. In 2019, Cancer Research UK stated: "We need a lot more research with reliable clinical trials before we can be sure that milk thistle will play any part in treating or preventing cancers."

There have been concerns about product safety. For example, the amount of silymarin noted on the product label may differ significantly from the actual amount contained in the product. There have also been findings of contamination with pesticides, microorganisms and mycotoxins.

== Gallery ==
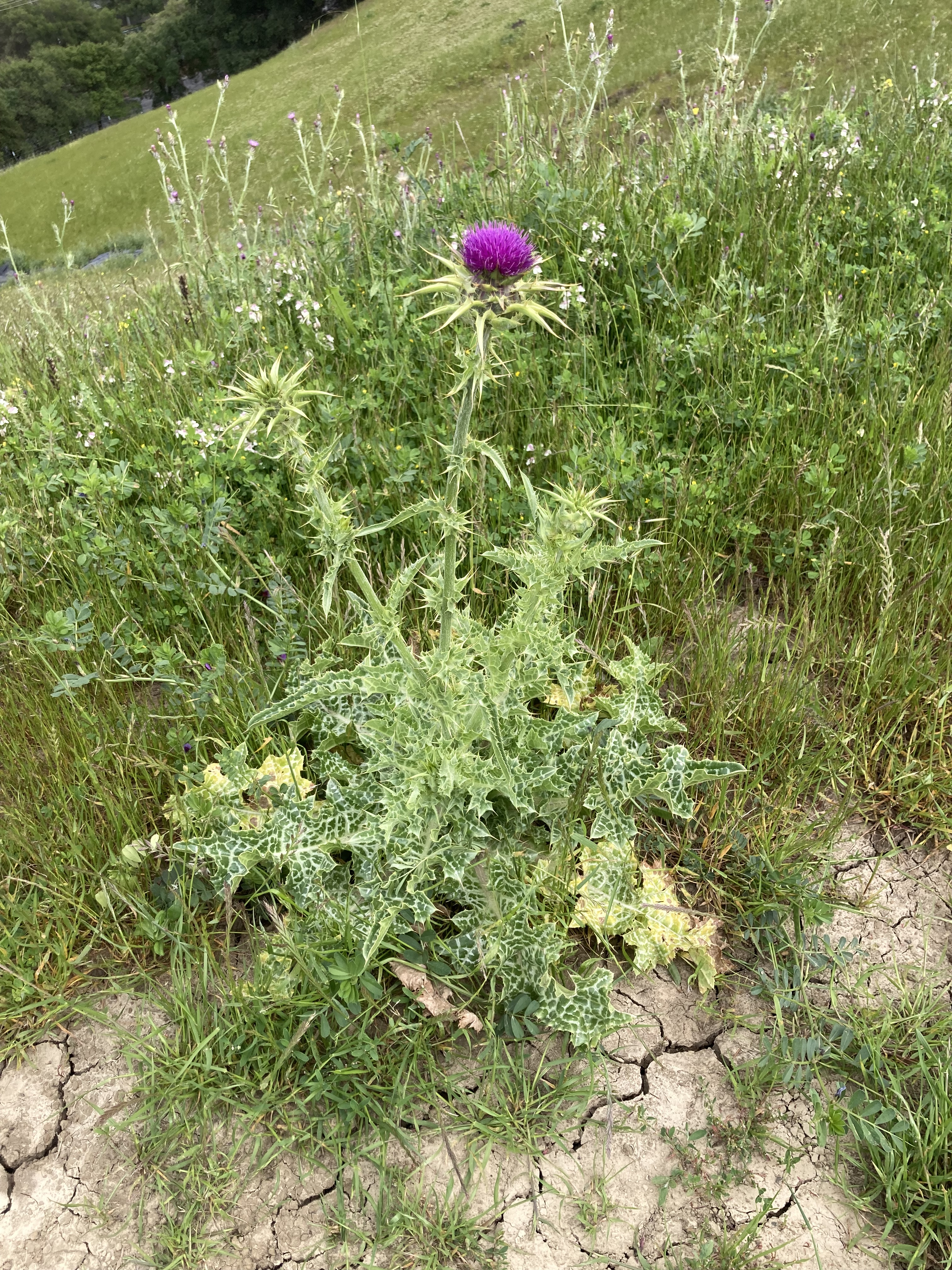
Silybum marianum at Briones Regional Park

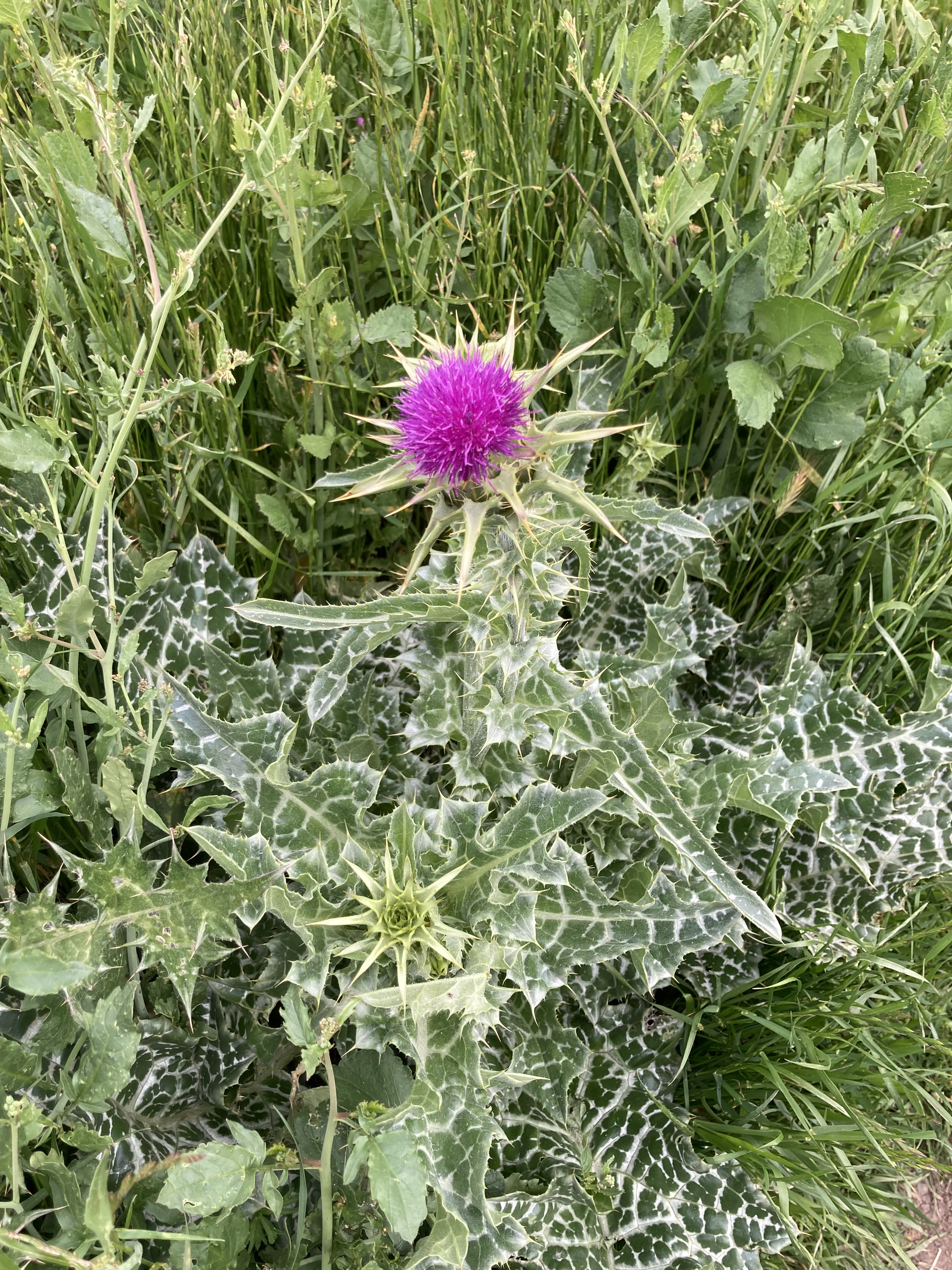
Growing in a field

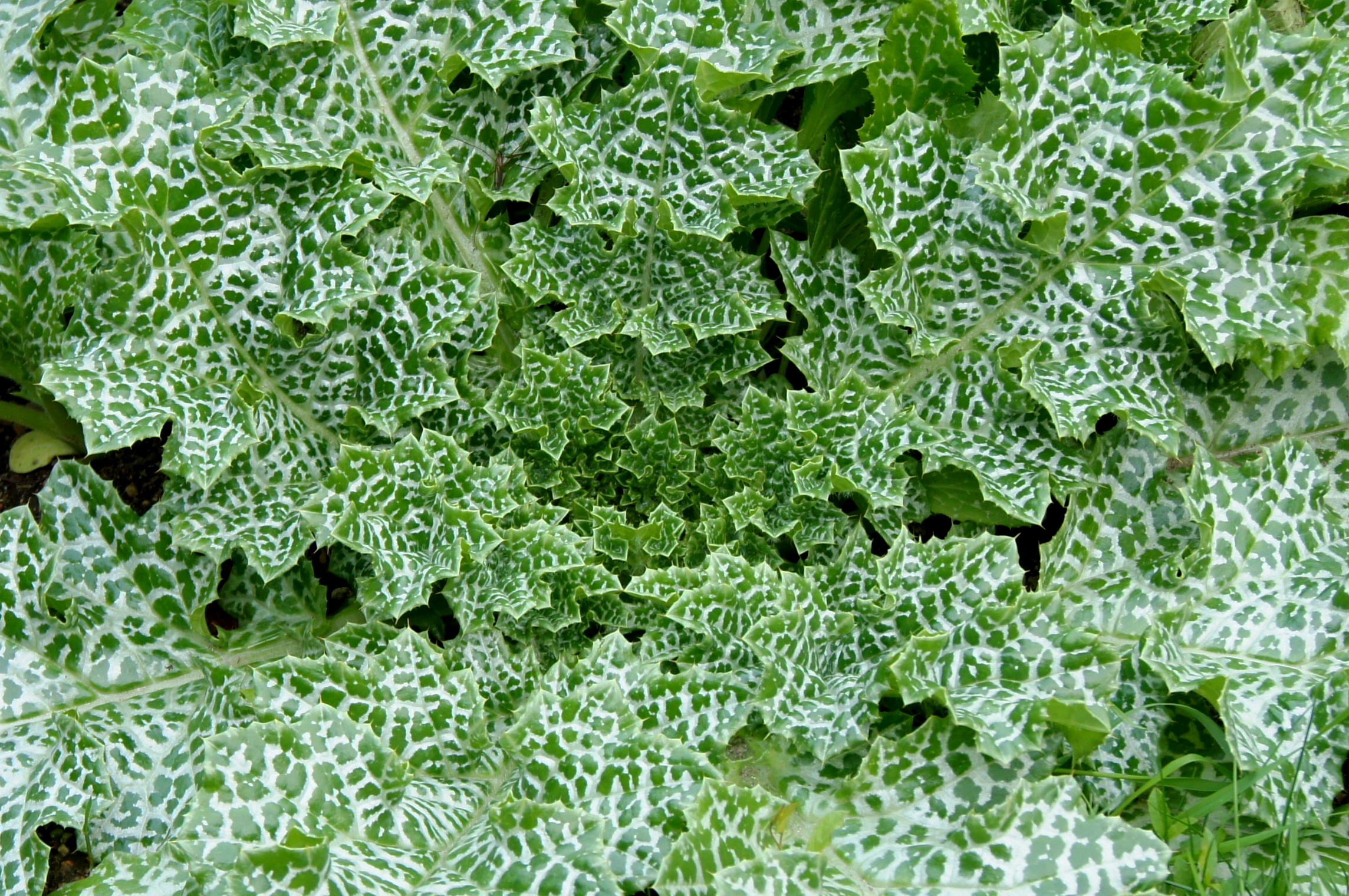
Detail of the foliage

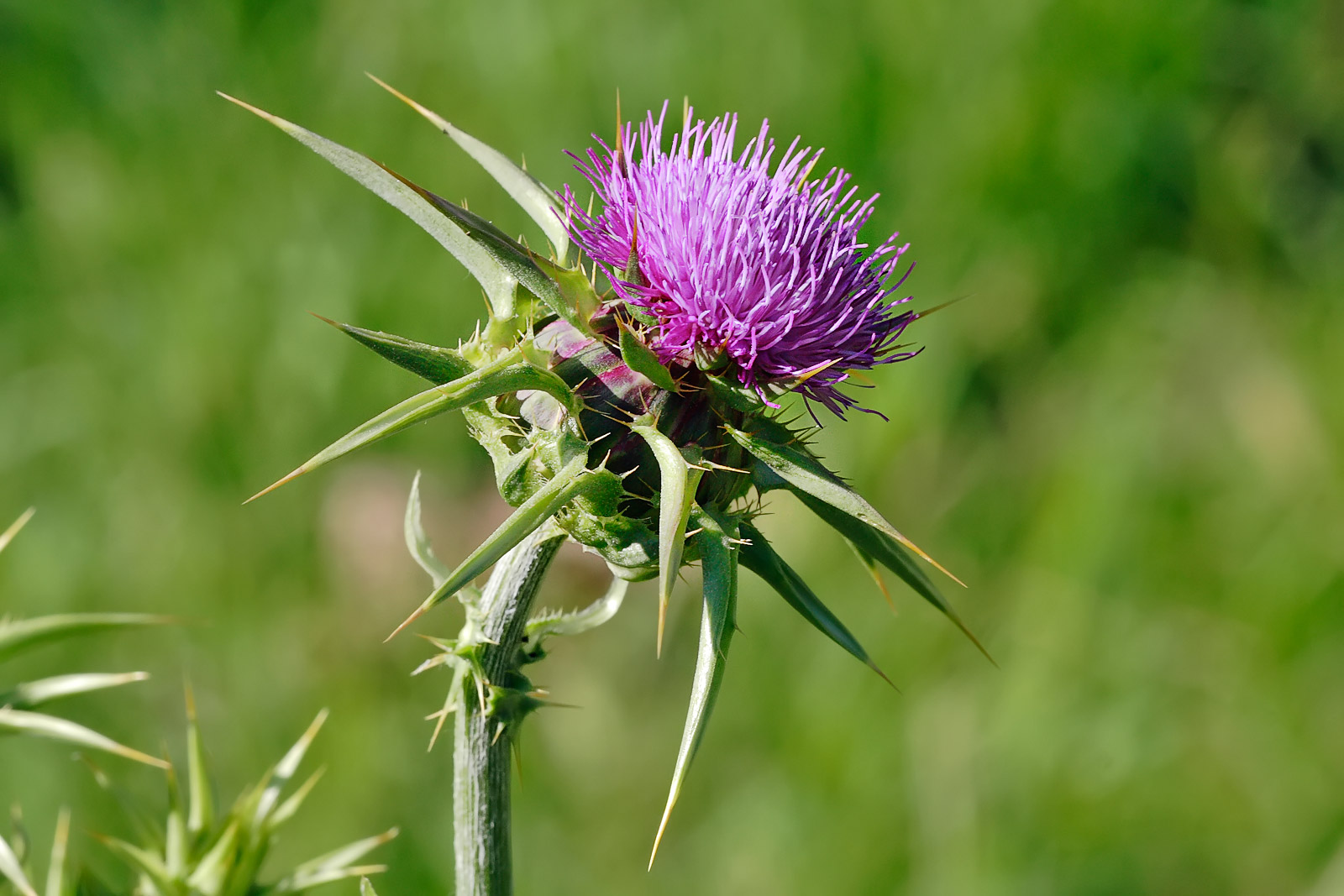
Detail of the flower
