= Olive leaf =

Leaves of the olive tree

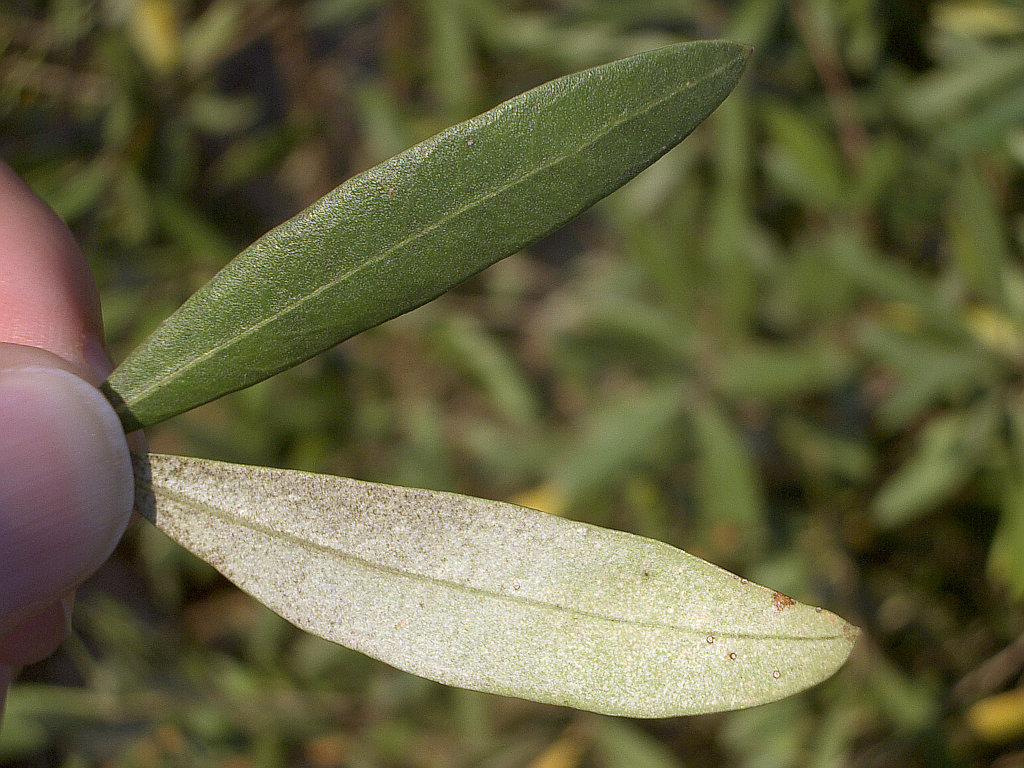
Leaves from an olive tree in Portugal

Olive leaf is the leaf of the olive tree (Olea europaea). It is used whole as a tea infusion, and as a food additive, primarily in the powder form of olive leaf extract. Olive leaves have rich content of polyphenols, which impart a sour taste.

== Characteristics ==
Olive leaves are dusty green on top and silvery-white underneath. They are narrow and oblong, measuring 4–10 centimetres (1.6–3.9 inches) long and 1–3 centimetres (0.39–1.18 inches) wide. When consumed, olive leaves have a sharp bitter taste; When infused as a tea, the intensity is moderated, but maintains an astringent flavor due to high levels of polyphenols and organic acids.

== Chemical compounds ==
Olive phenolics are much more concentrated in the leaves compared with olive oil or fruit: 1450 mg total phenolics per 100 grams fresh leaf versus 110 mg per 100 grams of fruit and 23 mg per 100 ml in extra virgin olive oil.

Chemical compounds in unprocessed olive leaf are oleuropein and hydroxytyrosol, as well as polyphenols, including luteolin, rutin, caffeic acid, catechin and apigenin. Elenolic acid is a component of olive oil and olive leaf extract (OLE); it can be considered a marker for maturation of olives. Oleuropein, together with other closely related compounds such as 10-hydroxyoleuropein, ligstroside and 10-hydroxyligstroside, are tyrosol esters of elenolic acid. The phenolic composition of OLE varies according to plant variety, harvesting season and method, leaf maturity, storage conditions and extraction method.

== Culinary uses ==
Several studies have examined the use of olive leaf extract in food processing and preservation, including as an additive to dairy, minced beef, and sausages.

== Research ==
Although OLE has been marketed for its purported health benefits, there is no clinical evidence that it has any effect. Scientific evidence for the supposed health effect of using olive leaf extract to manage blood glucose levels has been deemed insufficient by the European Food Safety Authority to have any causal relationship.

A 2024 systematic review and meta-analysis of randomized clinical trials concluded that further human studies were required to determine the possible effects of OLE on cardiovascular and metabolic measurements.
