= Sirtfood =

A sirtfood is a food that contains bioactive compounds believed to modulate the activity of sirtuins, a family of NAD⁺-dependent enzymes involved in cellular stress responses, metabolism, and ageing. These foods are typically rich in polyphenols and other plant bioactives associated with mitochondrial function, endogenous antioxidant defence mechanisms, and metabolic regulation.

== Definition ==
Sirtfoods are generally defined as foods containing compounds, often polyphenols and other plant bioactives, that have been shown, mainly in cell and animal studies, to influence sirtuin pathways. Such compounds include resveratrol, quercetin, catechin, isoflavones, curcumin, hydroxy tyrosol, and ferulic acid among others. The term refers to a category of foods rather than a specific dietary protocol.

== Biochemical background ==
Sirtuins (SIRT1–SIRT7 in humans) regulate numerous cellular processes, including energy homeostasis, genomic stability, inflammation, and stress responses. Many plant-derived bioactive molecules found in sirtfoods have been shown to interact with these pathways. Mechanistic studies highlight effects on mitochondrial biogenesis, autophagy, and redox signalling.

== Examples ==
Foods often described as sirtfoods include:

- Green tea (catechins)
- Berries (anthocyanins)
- Soy (isoflavones)
- Extra-virgin olive oil (oleuropein, hydroxy tyrosol)
- Buckwheat, capers and onions (quercetin)
- Turmeric (curcumin)
- Red grapes (resveratrol)
- Cereals and whole grains (ferulic acid)

These foods are primarily characterized by their high content of phytochemicals that may influence sirtuin activity.

== Research ==
Much of the evidence supporting sirtfoods stems from preclinical studies examining the molecular effects of bioactive plant compounds on sirtuin-related pathways. Findings suggest potential roles in healthy ageing, metabolic flexibility, and reduced oxidative stress. However, systematic studies indicate that robust clinical evidence in humans is limited, and effects may vary widely depending on dose, matrix, and bioavailability.

== Reception and criticism ==
While the concept of sirtfoods has gained attention in both scientific and popular contexts, critics argue that the term oversimplifies complex biochemical interactions and may lead to exaggerated claims. Nutrition researchers emphasize that sirtfoods should be viewed as components of a varied, plant-rich diet rather than as isolated foods and their constituents.
