= Oleocanthal =

Chemical compound

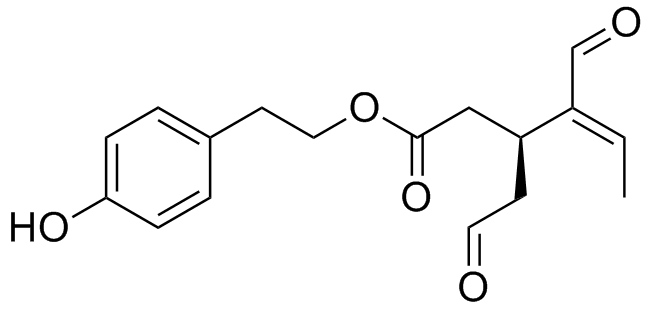
- Oleocanthal

Names
- Preferred IUPAC name 2-(4-Hydroxyphenyl)ethyl (3S,4E)-4-formyl-3-(2-oxoethyl)hex-4-enoate

Identifiers
CAS Number	289030-99-5
3D model (JSmol)	Interactive image
ChEBI	CHEBI:85673
ChEMBL	ChEMBL2172394
ChemSpider	9827154
IUPHAR/BPS	6308
PubChem CID	11652416
UNII	AC7QO6038O
CompTox Dashboard (EPA)	DTXSID40183104
- InChI: InChI=1S/C17H20O5/c1-2-14(12-19)15(7-9-18)11-17(21)22-10-8-13-3-5-16(20)6-4-13/h2-6,9,12,15,20H,7-8,10-11H2,1H3/b14-2-/t15-/m0/s1 Key: VPOVFCBNUOUZGG-VAKDEWRISA-N; InChI=1/C17H20O5/c1-2-14(12-19)15(7-9-18)11-17(21)22-10-8-13-3-5-16(20)6-4-13/h2-6,9,12,15,20H,7-8,10-11H2,1H3/b14-2-/t15-/m0/s1 Key: VPOVFCBNUOUZGG-VAKDEWRIBW
- SMILES: O=CC[C@H](C(=C/C)\C=O)CC(=O)OCCc1ccc(O)cc1

Properties
Chemical formula	C_{17}H_{20}O_{5}
Molar mass	304.34 g/mol
- Except where otherwise noted, data are given for materials in their standard state (at 25 °C [77 °F], 100 kPa). verify (what is ?) Infobox references

Oleocanthal is a phenylethanoid, or a type of natural phenolic compound found in extra-virgin olive oil. It appears to be responsible for the burning sensation that occurs in the back of the throat when consuming such oil. Oleocanthal is a tyrosol ester and its chemical structure is related to oleuropein, also found in olive oil.

== Potential biological effects ==
=== Anti-inflammatory ===
Oleocanthal has been found to have anti-inflammatory and antioxidant properties in vitro. Similar to the classical non-steroidal anti-inflammatory drug ibuprofen, it is a non-selective inhibitor of cyclooxygenase (COX). 50 g (more than three and a half tablespoons) of a typical extra virgin olive oil per day contains an amount of oleocanthal with similar in vitro anti-inflammatory effect as 1/10 of the adult ibuprofen dose. It is therefore suggested that long-term consumption of small quantities may be responsible in part for the low incidence of heart disease and Alzheimer's disease associated with a Mediterranean diet. However, 50 g is a great deal of olive oil for most consumers; moreover, the absorption, metabolism, and distribution of oleocanthal is not well characterized, and it is not known whether these in vitro effects actually occur in the body. "Against this background, the in vivo anti-inflammatory effects of dietary oleocanthal cannot be as relevant as hypothesized by Beauchamp et al.."

Oleocanthal is an activator of the TRPA1 ion channel, which is activated by ibuprofen. Oleocanthal is found to be responsible for the burning sensation when consuming extra-virgin olive oil.

Recently it has been demonstrated that oleocanthal shows potential as a therapeutic agent in the treatment of inflammatory degenerative joint diseases. Oleocanthal inhibits LPS-induced NO production in J774 macrophages, without affecting cell viability. Moreover, it inhibits MIP-1α and IL-6 mRNA expression, as well as protein synthesis, in both ATDC5 chondrocytes and J774 macrophages. Oleocanthal also inhibits IL-1β, TNF-α and GM-CSF protein synthesis from LPS-stimulated macrophages.

=== Beta-amyloid ===
Studies in an animal model suggest that oleocanthal can reduce the accumulation of β-amyloid proteins via up-regulation of P-glycoprotein and LRP1.

=== Selective cytotoxicity ===
Oleocanthal is capable of killing a variety of human cancer cells in vitro while leaving healthy cells unharmed. While apoptosis requires between 16 and 24 hours, oleocanthal operated within 30 minutes to one hour. Oleocanthal pierces cancer cells' lysosomes, the containers that store the cell's waste products, releasing enzymes that kill the cell. In healthy cells, the application of oleocanthal caused a temporary halt in their life cycles, but after 24 hours they returned to normal.

Cell apoptosis is tested by treating the lysosomal membrane with acridine orange. Acridine orange radiates a red fluorescent color at an increased concentration in a lysosome that is undamaged. Oleocanthal weakens the red fluorescent color indicating apoptosis; however, non-cancerous cells will not experience apoptosis. This is a result of lysosome membrane permeabilization promoting cancer cell death. Lysosomal membrane permeabilization is not activated by oleocanthal in non-cancerous cells.

Oleocanthal has also been shown in vitro to inhibit c-met, an important tyrosine kinase receptor which is responsible for proliferation of many cell types. The same study that found these results also showed that oleocanthal had no deleterious effects on healthy control cells over a span of 48 hours, the same amount of time that it took for inhibition of c-met in MB-231 breast cancer cells. Cells are forced into cell cycle arrest during G1 phase, effectively decreasing the viability of this highly invasive cell line.

=== Potential medical uses ===
Although it is not being administered as a drug currently, many strategies are being studied to use oleocanthal as a small drug inhibitor of C-Met, as well a potential monoclonal antibody against hereditary gingival fibromatosis (HGF) and C-Met.

== See also ==
- Hydroxytyrosol
- Oleuropein
- Olive leaf
