= Unfiltered olive oil =

Unfiltered olive oil (also known as cloudy olive oil, veiled olive oil, or olio nuovo) is an intermediate product of olive oil extraction. It is actually the initial cloudy juice of the olive drupes soon after crushing, separation and decanting and before final filtration. The oil is either filtered or stored in tanks to settle for weeks or months to allow sediments to be separated from the oil; this is known as racking. Once opened, unfiltered olive oil has a shorter life because the olive particles continue to ferment in the bottle.

== Application ==
Although most commercially available olive oil in the world market is filtered, unfiltered olive oil is gaining increasing popularity amongst olive oil small scale producers, some chefs, and people who prefer a more "natural" aesthetic. They believe that this oil has superior sensory characteristics compared to filtered olive oil, because it is a less processed product.

== Nature of cloudiness ==
Unfiltered olive has aspects of both a suspension and an emulsion. Plant material from olive drupes is suspended in oil due to lack of the filtering step, along with microdroplets of vegetative and non-vegetative water in small amounts (0.1–0.3%) forming in a water-oil emulsion. Unfiltered olive oil initially has higher levels of phenolics that form a complex polyphenol-protein complex. This complex interacts within the suspension/emulsion system and contributes to the formation and maintenance of the physicochemical properties of this oil. However, the presence of water in unfiltered oil leads to a more rapid hydrolysis of these water-associated phenolics, and also to hydrolysis of the triglycerides in the oil, and enzymes present in particles of olive fruit and pit and pathogens such as yeasts can accelerate the rate of degradation of the quality of the oil and increase the oil free acidity. The overall effect of filtration on olive oil durability is controversial, with different studies coming to different conclusions, and likely also depends on the specific systems used to filter the oil.

The main phenolics found in olive oil are secoiridoids, hydroxytyrosol, and tyrosol, along with caffeic, vanillic, p-coumaric, syringic and p-hydroxy benzoic acids, 3-hydroxyphenylethanol and 3,4-dihydroxyphenylethanol.

== Natural cloudiness versus low-temperature cloudiness ==
Olive oil cloudiness resulting from sediments discussed in this article is different from the characteristic cloudiness of olive oil due to storage at low temperatures [REF]. This type of cloudiness is the result of congealing of triglycerides. When these oils are returned to room temperature, they become again transparent. Unfiltered olive oil has a cloudy appearance that can persist months after the oil has been returned to room temperature.
