= Verbascoside =

- Chemical structure of verbascoside

Names
- IUPAC name 2-(3,4-Dihydroxyphenyl)ethyl α-L-rhamnopyranosyl-(1→4)-{5-O-[(2E)-3-(3,4-dihydroxymethyl)prop-2-enoyl]-β-D-glucopyranoside}
- Systematic IUPAC name (2R,3R,4R,5R,6R)-6-[2-(3,4-Dihydroxyphenyl)ethoxy]-5-hydroxy-2-(hydroxymethyl)-4-{[(2S,3R,4R,5R,6S)-3,4,5-trihydroxy-6-methyloxan-2-yl]oxy}oxan-3-yl (2E)-3-(3,4-dihydroxymethyl)prop-2-enoate
- Other names Acteoside; Kusaginin; Orobanchin

Identifiers
CAS Number	61276-17-3
3D model (JSmol)	Interactive image
ChEBI	CHEBI:132853
ChEMBL	ChEMBL231853
ChemSpider	4445112
ECHA InfoCard	100.112.547
PubChem CID	5281800
UNII	3TGX09BD5B
CompTox Dashboard (EPA)	DTXSID701021953
- InChI: InChI=1S/C29H36O15/c1-13-22(36)23(37)24(38)29(41-13)44-27-25(39)28(40-9-8-15-3-6-17(32)19(34)11-15)42-20(12-30)26(27)43-21(35)7-4-14-2-5-16(31)18(33)10-14/h2-7,10-11,13,20,22-34,36-39H,8-9,12H2,1H3/b7-4+/t13-,20+,22-,23+,24+,25+,26+,27+,28+,29-/m0/s1 Key: FBSKJMQYURKNSU-ZLSOWSIRSA-N; InChI=1/C29H36O15/c1-13-22(36)23(37)24(38)29(41-13)44-27-25(39)28(40-9-8-15-3-6-17(32)19(34)11-15)42-20(12-30)26(27)43-21(35)7-4-14-2-5-16(31)18(33)10-14/h2-7,10-11,13,20,22-34,36-39H,8-9,12H2,1H3/b7-4+/t13-,20+,22-,23+,24+,25+,26+,27+,28+,29-/m0/s1 Key: FBSKJMQYURKNSU-ZLSOWSIRBQ
- SMILES: C[C@H]1[C@@H]([C@H]([C@H]([C@@H](O1)O[C@@H]2[C@H]([C@@H](O[C@@H]([C@H]2OC(=O)/C=C/C3=CC(=C(C=C3)O)O)CO)OCCC4=CC(=C(C=C4)O)O)O)O)O)O

Properties
Chemical formula	C_{29}H_{36}O_{15}
Molar mass	624.592 g·mol^{−1}
- Except where otherwise noted, data are given for materials in their standard state (at 25 °C [77 °F], 100 kPa). verify (what is ?) Infobox references

Verbascoside is a polyphenol glycoside in which the phenylpropanoid caffeic acid and the phenylethanoid hydroxytyrosol form an ester and an ether bond respectively, to the rhamnose part of a disaccharide, namely β-(3′,4′-dihydroxyphenyl)ethyl-O-α-L-rhamnopyranosyl(1→3)-β-D-(4-O-caffeoyl)-glucopyranoside.

== Occurrences ==
=== Natural occurrences ===
Verbascoside can be found in species in all the families of the order Lamiales (syn. Scrophulariales). Only two examples are known from outside the order, in the clade Asterids.

in the Lamiales

In the family Lamiaceae, it can be found in the medicinal plants in the genus Phlomis, in the Scrophulariaceae, in Verbascum phlomoides, Verbascum mallophorum, or, in the family Buddlejaceae, in Buddleja globosa or Buddleja cordata, in the family Bignoniaceae, in Pithecoctenium sp and Tynanthus panurensis, in the family Orobanchaceae, in Cistanche sp and Orobanche rapum-genistae, in the Plantaginaceae, in Plantago lanceolata, in Verbenaceae, in Verbena officinalis (common vervain), Aloysia citrodora (lemon verbena) and Lantana camara, in the Oleaceae, in Olea europaea (olive), in the Lentibulariaceae, in the carnivorous plant Pinguicula lusitanica, and, in the Byblidaceae, in Byblis liniflora.

=== Derivatives ===
Verbascoside derivatives can be found in the Verbascum undulatum and notably apiosides in Verbascum sp.

=== In in vitro cultures ===
It can also be produced in plant cell cultures of Leucosceptrum sp (Lamiaceae) and Syringa sp (Oleaceae). It can also be produced in hairy roots cultures of Paulownia tomentosa (empress tree, Paulowniaceae).

== Biological activity ==
Verbascoside has an antimicrobial activity, notably against Staphylococcus aureus. It can also have anti-inflammatory properties.

Although some in vitro genotoxicity of verbascoside has been reported on human lymphocytes with an involvement of PARP-1 and p53 proteins, subsequent in vivo tests reported no genotoxicity for high dosage oral administration. It is a protein kinase C inhibitor.

== See also ==
- Echinacoside
