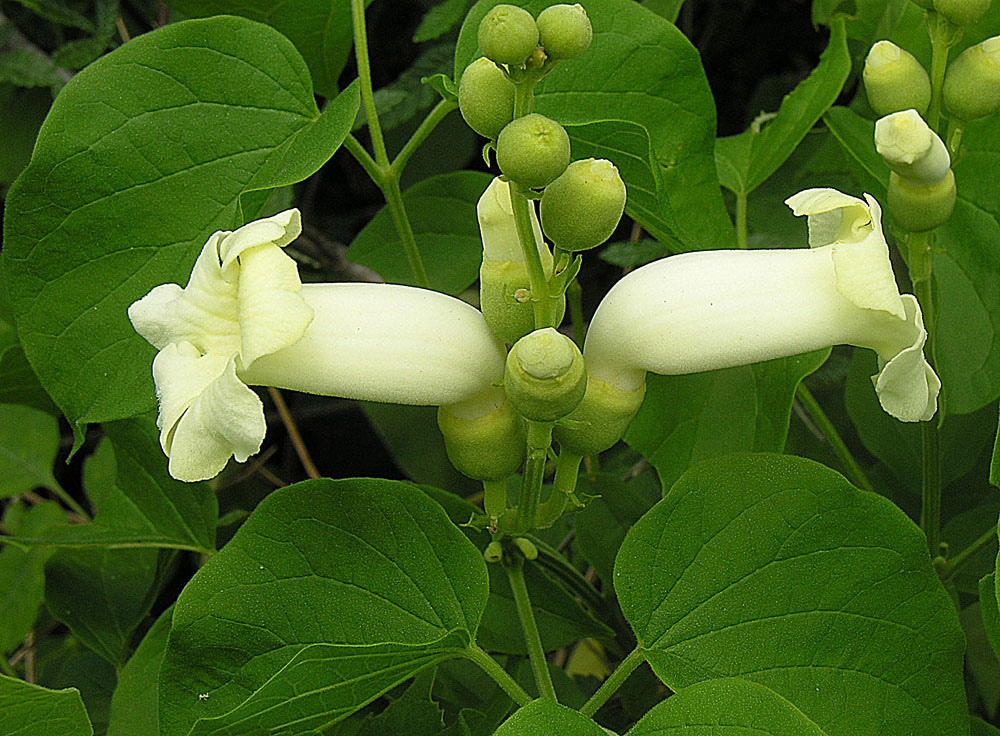

Scientific classification
- Kingdom: Plantae
- Clade: Tracheophytes
- Clade: Angiosperms
- Clade: Eudicots
- Clade: Asterids
- Order: Lamiales
- Family: Bignoniaceae
- Genus: Amphilophium
- Species: A. crucigerum

Binomial name
- Amphilophium crucigerum (L.) L.G.Lohmann

Synonyms
- Anisostichus crucigera (L.) Small; Bignonia botryoides Cham.; Bignonia catharinae DC.; Bignonia crucigera L.; Bignonia echinata Aubl.; Bignonia echinata Jacq.; Bignonia hexagona DC.; Bignonia lundii DC.; Bignonia muricata DC.; Bignonia phaseoloides Cham.; Bignonia squalus Vell.; Bignonia tiliifolia Kunth; Bignonia vitalba Cham.; Neves-armondia cordifolia (Mart.) K.Schum.; Petastoma phaseoloides (Cham.) Miers; Pithecoctenium aubletii Splitg.; Pithecoctenium botryoides (Cham.) DC.; Pithecoctenium catharinae DC.; Pithecoctenium cordifolium Mart.; Pithecoctenium crucigerum (L.) A.H.Gentry; Pithecoctenium echinatum (Jacq.) Baill.; Pithecoctenium glaucum Rusby; Pithecoctenium hexagonum DC.; Pithecoctenium lundii DC.; Pithecoctenium muricatum Moc. ex DC.; Pithecoctenium phaseoloides (Cham.) Schenck; Pithecoctenium squalus (Vell.) DC.; Pithecoctenium tribrachiatum Loes.; Pithecoctenium vitalba (Cham.) DC.

= Amphilophium crucigerum =

Species of flowering plant

Amphilophium crucigerum is a species of flowering plant in the family Bignoniaceae, native from Mexico through Central America into South America as far south as Argentina. It was first described by Carl Linnaeus (as Bignonia crucigera) in 1753. The synonym Pithecoctenium crucigerum has often been used.

The species has become an invasive weed in Australia. Chemical investigation of methanol extracted from this species yielded the iridoid glycoside theviridoside along with five phenylethanoid glycosides (verbascoside, isoverbascoside, forsythoside B, jionoside D and leucosceptoside B), these last all active against DPPH.
