= Olive pomace oil =

Type of olive oil

Olive pomace oil is olive oil that is extracted from olive pulp after the first press. Once the mechanical oil extraction of olive oil is complete, approximately 5–8% of the oil remains in the pulp, which then needs to be extracted with the help of solvents, an industrial technique used in the production of most other edible oils including canola, peanut, and sunflower. Although the oil extracted in this manner is still olive oil, at retail it may not simply be called "olive oil". This is because the International Olive Council defines olive oil as "the oil obtained solely from the fruit of the olive tree, to the exclusion of oils obtained using solvents or re-esterification processes".

== Retail grades ==
The International Olive Council has classified olive pomace oil into the following categories:

=== Crude olive pomace oil ===
Olive-pomace oil whose characteristics are those laid down for this category. It is intended for refining for use for human consumption, or it is intended for technical use.

=== Refined olive pomace oil ===
Oil obtained by refining crude olive-pomace oil. It has a free acidity, expressed as oleic acid, of not more than 0.3 grams per 100 grams and its other characteristics correspond to those laid down for this category.

=== Olive pomace oil ===
Oil consisting of a blend of refined olive-pomace oil and virgin olive oils fit for consumption as they are.

In 2001, the British Food Standards Agency removed from sale four Greek olive-pomace oil products that contained elevated levels of benzo(a)pyrene.

In 2001, the Spanish Ministry of Health and Consumption, without declaring a health alert, ordered the precautionary immobilisation of olive pomace oil in Spain after detecting the presence of alpha-benzopyrene in batches exported to the Czech Republic that exceeded the limits set by the World Health Organization. Alpha-benzopyrene (or benzo-a-pyrene) is a polycyclic aromatic hydrocarbon (PAH) present in many foods, especially those that have undergone heating at very high temperatures (over 300 °C), such as those cooked on grills and barbecues.

The immobilisation of the oil resulted in a collapse in demand in Spain and abroad, reducing consumption by less than half in the following three years. Although the product withdrawal lasted only a few weeks, the consequences were very negative for the sector, which sued the Administration for damages estimated at 100 million euros. In July 2007, the Spanish Supreme Court declared the withdrawal of olive pomace oil illegal, considering the confiscation by the Ministry of Health unjustified and disproportionate. Before that ruling, several Spanish regional governments were condemned to pay compensation to sector entrepreneurs as they were competent to execute the health alert.

== Nutrition facts ==
Facts per 100 ml

- 824 calories / 100 ml
- Total fat : 100 ml
- Saturated fat : 14 ml
- Polyunsaturated fat : 7 ml
- Monounsaturated fat : 79 ml

Olive pomace oil contains no cholesterol, carbohydrates, protein, sugars, dietary fiber or micronutrients.
