= Elenolic acid =

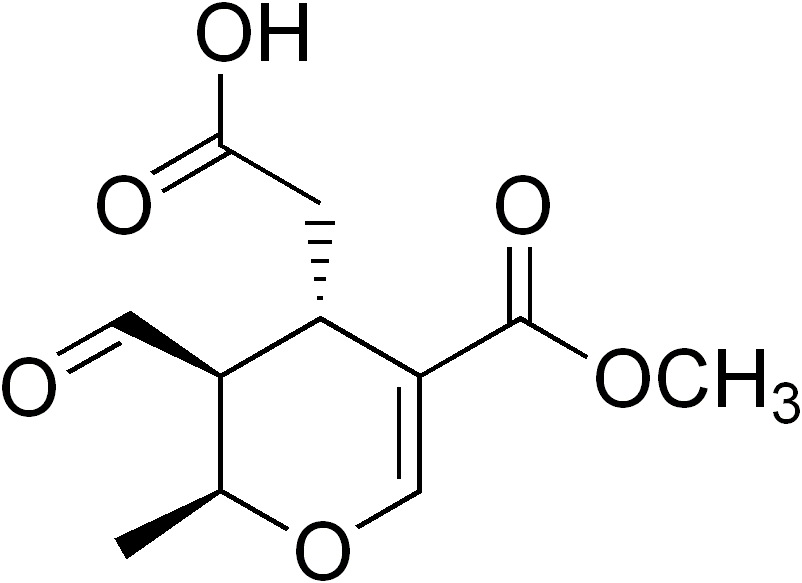
- Elenolic acid

Names
- IUPAC name 2-[(2S,3S,4S)-3-formyl-5-methoxycarbonyl-2-methyl-3, 4-dihydro-2H-pyran-4-yl]acetic acid

Identifiers
| CAS Number | 34422-12-3 |
| 3D model (JSmol) | Interactive image; Interactive image |
| ChemSpider | 148325 |
| PubChem CID | 169607 |
| UNII | 5C9M8PFI8E |
| CompTox Dashboard (EPA) | DTXSID30188002 |
- InChI: InChI=1S/C11H14O6/c1-6-8(4-12)7(3-10(13)14)9(5-17-6)11(15)16-2/h4-8H,3H2,1-2H3,(H,13,14)/t6-,7-,8+/m0/s1 Key: MQFAJBBHEYTHKF-BIIVOSGPSA-N; InChI=1/C11H14O6/c1-6-8(4-12)7(3-10(13)14)9(5-17-6)11(15)16-2/h4-8H,3H2,1-2H3,(H,13,14)/t6-,7-,8+/m0/s1 Key: MQFAJBBHEYTHKF-BIIVOSGPBN
- SMILES: CC1C(C(C(=CO1)C(=O)OC)CC(=O)O)C=O; O=C[C@H]1[C@@H](C(=C\O[C@H]1C)/C(=O)OC)CC(=O)O

Properties
| Chemical formula | C_{11}H_{14}O_{6} |
| Molar mass | 242.227 g·mol^{−1} |
- Except where otherwise noted, data are given for materials in their standard state (at 25 °C [77 °F], 100 kPa). verify (what is ?) Infobox references

Elenolic acid is a component of olive oil and olive leaf extract. It can be considered as a marker for maturation of olives.

It is a subunit of oleuropein, a bitter chemical compound found in olives and the leaves of the olive tree, alongside closely related compounds such as 10-hydroxyoleuropein, ligstroside and 10-hydroxyligstroside, are tyrosol esters of elenolic acid.
