= Olive oil =

Liquid fat made from olives

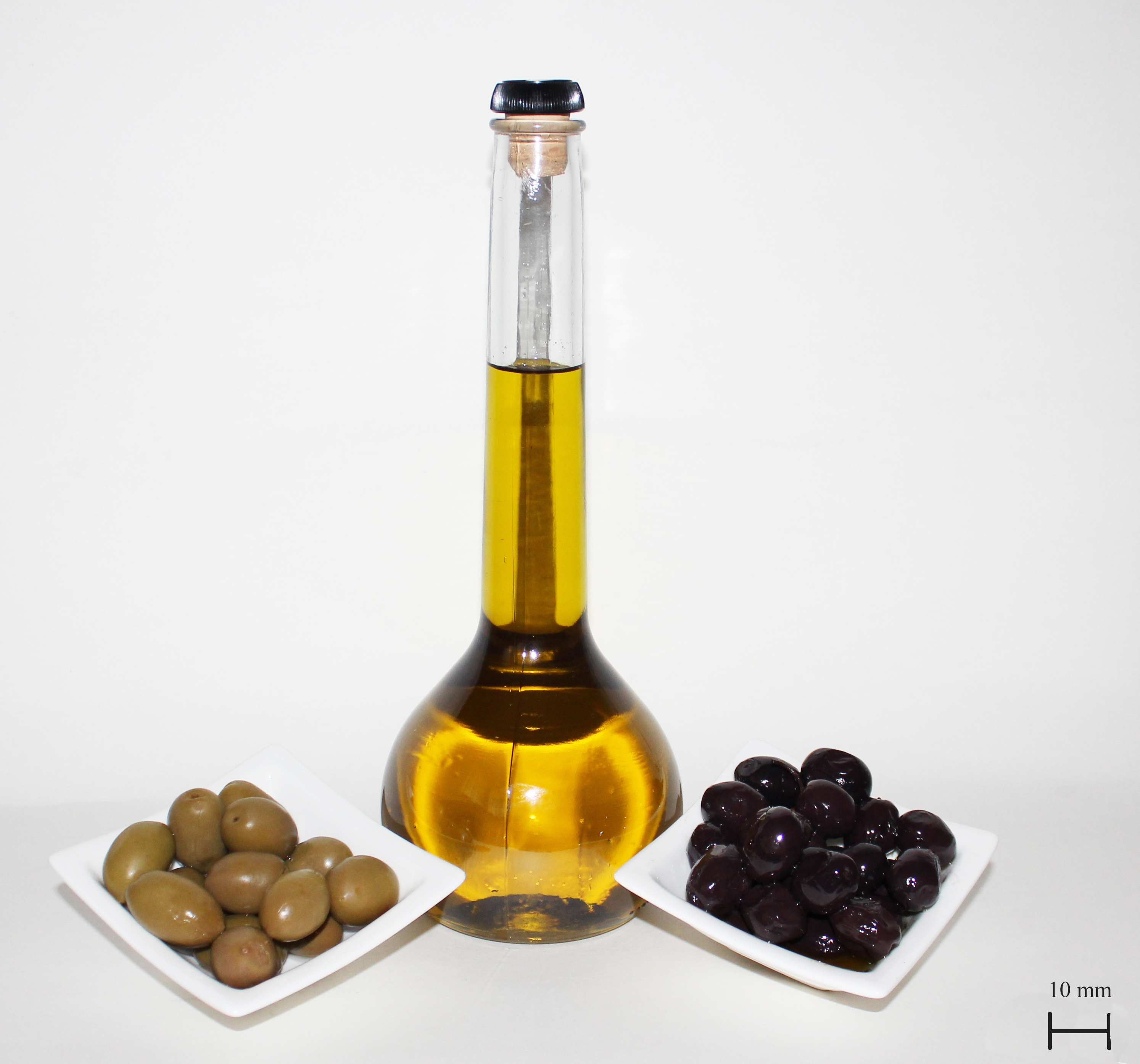
- Extra virgin olive oil presented with green and black preserved table olives

Fat composition

Saturated fats
- Total saturated: Palmitic acid: 13.0% Stearic acid: 1.5%

Unsaturated fats
- Total unsaturated: > 85%
- Monounsaturated: Oleic acid: 70.0% Palmitoleic acid: 0.3–3.5%
- Polyunsaturated: Linoleic acid: 15.0% α-Linolenic acid: 0.5%

Properties
- Food energy per 100 g (3.5 oz): 3,700 kJ (880 kcal)
- Melting point: −6.0 °C (21.2 °F)
- Boiling point: 299 °C (570 °F)
- Smoke point: 190–215 °C (374–419 °F) (extra virgin); 215 °C (419 °F) (virgin); 210 °C (410 °F) (refined)
- Solidity at 20 °C (68 °F): Liquid
- Specific gravity at 20 °C (68 °F): 0.911
- Viscosity at 20 °C (68 °F): 84 cP
- Refractive index: 1.4677–1.4705 (virgin and refined); 1.4680–1.4707 (pomace)
- Iodine value: 75–94 (virgin and refined); 75–92 (pomace)
- Acid value: maximum: 6.6% (refined and pomace); 0.8% (extra virgin)
- Saponification value: 184–196 (virgin and refined); 182–193 (pomace)
- Peroxide value: 20 (virgin); 10 (refined and pomace)

Olive oil is a vegetable oil obtained by pressing whole olives (the fruit of Olea europaea, a traditional tree crop of the Mediterranean Basin) and extracting the oil.

It is commonly used in cooking for frying foods, as a condiment, or as a salad dressing. It can also be found in some cosmetics, pharmaceuticals, soaps, and fuels for traditional oil lamps. It also has additional uses in some religions. The olive is one of three core food plants in Mediterranean cuisine, with wheat and grapes. Olive trees have been cultivated around the Mediterranean since the 8th millennium BC.

In 2022, Spain was the world's largest producer, manufacturing 24% of the world's total. Other large producers were Italy, Greece, and Turkey, collectively accounting for 59% of the global market.

The composition of olive oil varies with the cultivar, altitude, time of harvest, and extraction process. It consists mainly of oleic acid (up to 83%), with smaller amounts of other fatty acids including linoleic acid (up to 21%) and palmitic acid (up to 20%). Extra virgin olive oil (EVOO) is required to have no more than 0.8% free acidity, and is considered to have favorable flavor characteristics.

== History ==
Olive oil has long been a common ingredient in Mediterranean cuisine, including ancient Greek and Roman cuisine. Wild olives, which originated in Asia Minor, were collected by Neolithic people as early as the 8th millennium BC. Besides food, olive oil has been used for religious rituals, medicines, as a fuel in oil lamps, soap-making, and skincare application. The Spartans and other Greeks used oil to rub themselves while exercising in the gymnasia. From its beginnings early in the 7th century BC, the cosmetic use of olive oil quickly spread to all of the Hellenic city-states, together with athletes training in the nude, and lasted close to a thousand years despite its great expense. Olive oil was also popular as a form of birth control; Aristotle in his History of Animals recommends applying a mixture of olive oil combined with either oil of cedar, ointment of lead, or ointment of frankincense to the cervix to prevent pregnancy.

=== Early cultivation ===
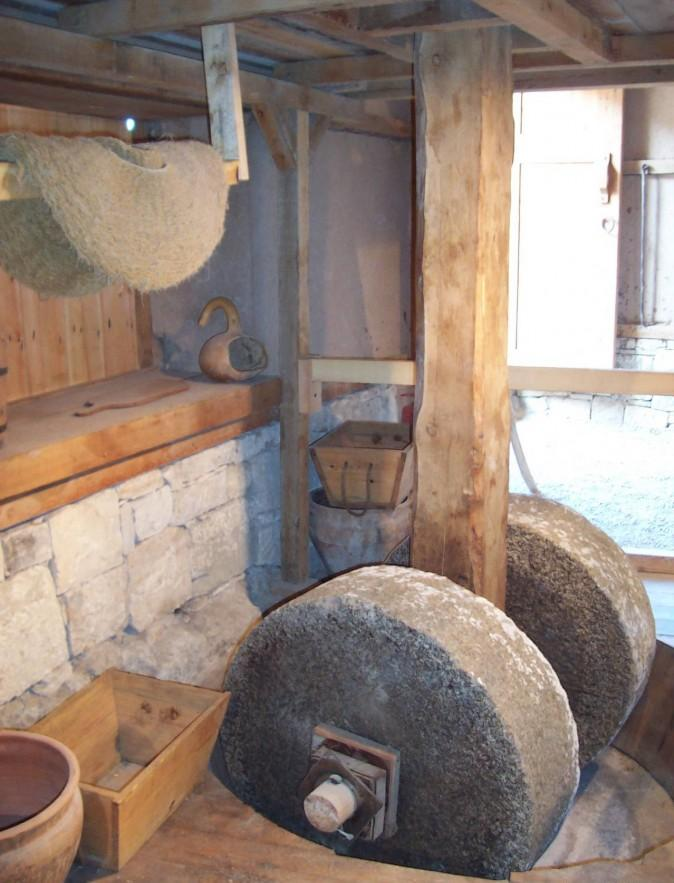
Ancient Greek olive oil production workshop in Klazomenai, Ionia (modern Turkey)

The exact date and location of olive tree domestication are unclear. The modern olive tree may have originated in ancient Persia and Mesopotamia and spread to the Levant and later to North Africa, though some scholars argue for an Egyptian origin.

The oldest traces of olive oil in Italy date back to the 3rd millennium BC. The olive tree reached Greece, Carthage and Libya sometime in the 28th century BC, having been spread westward by the Phoenicians. Until around 1500 BC, eastern coastal areas of the Mediterranean were most heavily cultivated. Evidence also suggests that olives were being grown in Crete as long ago as 2500 BC. The earliest surviving olive oil amphorae date to 3500 BC (Early Minoan times), though the production of olive oil is assumed to have started before 4000 BC. Olive trees were certainly cultivated by the Late Minoan period (1500 BC) in Crete, and perhaps as early as the Early Minoan. The cultivation of olive trees in Crete became particularly intense in the post-palatial period and played an important role in the island's economy, as it did across the Mediterranean. Later, as Greek colonies were established in other parts of the Mediterranean, olive farming was introduced to places like Spain and continued to spread throughout the Roman Empire.

Olive trees were introduced to the Americas in the 16th century, when cultivation began in areas with a climate similar to the Mediterranean, such as Chile, Argentina, and California.

Recent genetic studies suggest that species used by modern cultivars descend from multiple wild populations, but detailed history of domestication is unknown.

=== Trade and production ===
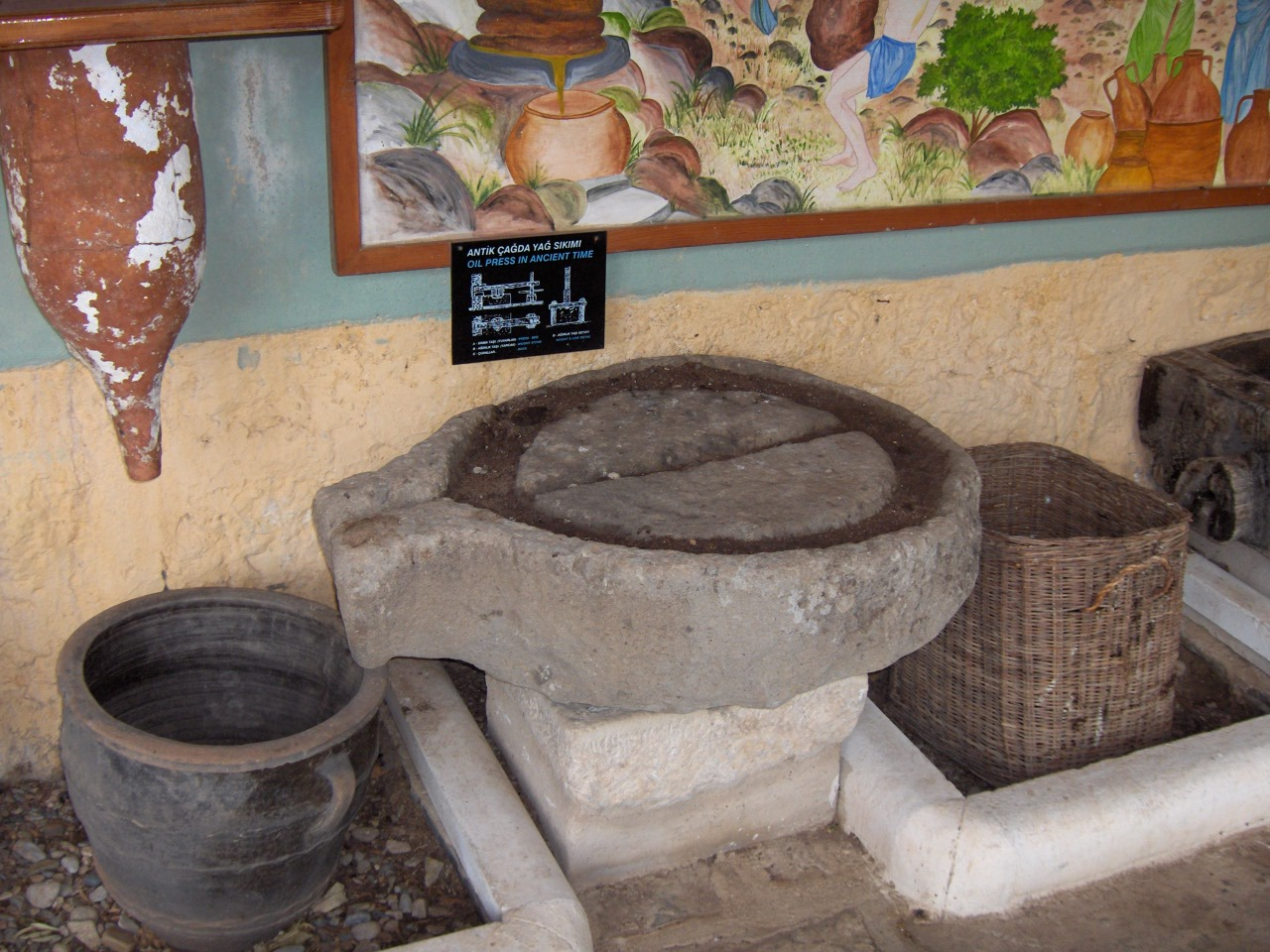
Ancient oil press (Bodrum Museum of Underwater Archaeology, Bodrum, Turkey)

Archaeological evidence in Galilee shows that by 6000 BC olives were being turned into olive oil and in 4500 BC at a now-submerged prehistoric settlement south of Haifa.

Olive trees and oil production in the Eastern Mediterranean can be traced to archives of the ancient city-state Ebla (2600–2240 BC), which were located on the outskirts of Aleppo. Here, some dozen documents dated 2400 BC describe the lands of the king and the queen. These belonged to a library of clay tablets perfectly preserved by having been baked in the fire that destroyed the palace. A later source is the frequent mentions of oil in the Tanakh.

Dynastic Egyptians before 2000 BC imported olive oil from Crete, Syria, and Canaan, and oil was an important item of commerce and wealth. Remains of olive oil have been found in jugs over 4,000 years old in a tomb on the island of Naxos in the Aegean Sea. Sinuhe, the Egyptian exile who lived in northern Canaan c.1960 BC, wrote of abundant olive trees. The Minoans used olive oil in religious ceremonies. The oil became a principal product of the Minoan civilization, where it is thought to have represented wealth.

Olive oil was also a major export of Mycenaean Greece (c. 1450–1150 BC). Scholars believe the oil was made by a process where olives were placed in woven mats and squeezed. The oil was collected in vats. This process was known from the Bronze Age, was used by the Egyptians, and continued to be used through the Hellenistic period. In the Iron Age, settlements in and around the Judaean Lowlands, including Ekron, Timnah, and Gezer, emerged as key hubs for olive oil production and commerce. Evidence from the Samaria Ostraca, discovered in the capital of the Kingdom of Israel, includes a reference to "washed oil," a term believed to refer to virgin olive oil.

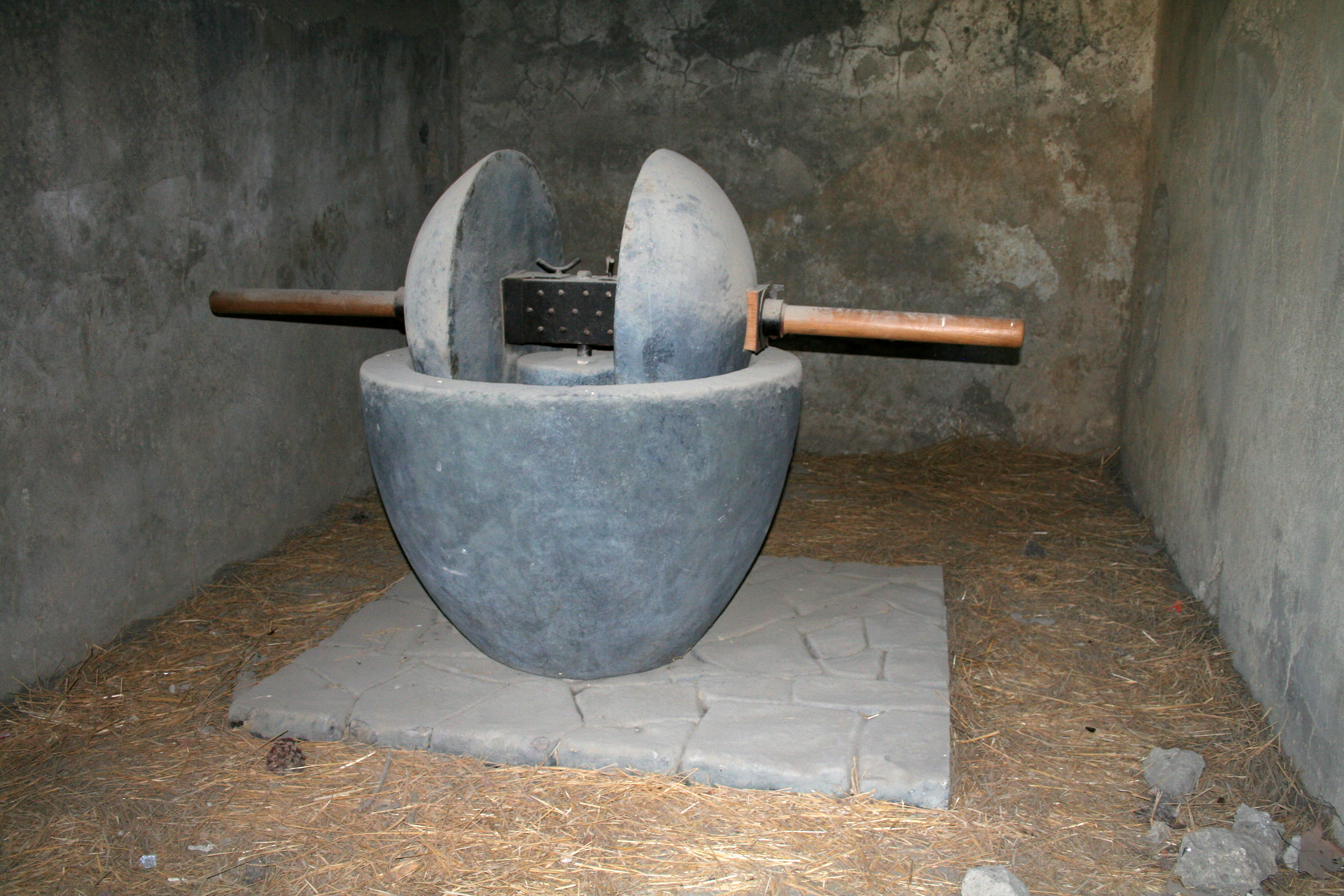
Olive crusher (trapetum) in Pompeii (79 AD)

Olive oil may have been produced as early as the Bronze Age in Italy, though this intensified throughout the first millennium BCE and into the Roman period. Some of the earliest evidence of rotary olive mills for the production of olive oil have been found in southern Italy. The importance of olive oil as a commercial commodity increased after the Roman conquest of Egypt, Greece, and Asia Minor, which led to more trade along the Mediterranean. Olive trees were planted throughout the entire Mediterranean basin during the evolution of the Roman Republic and Empire. According to the historian Pliny the Elder, Italy had "excellent olive oil at reasonable prices" by the 1st century AD—"the best in the Mediterranean". More sophisticated production techniques such as the olive press and trapetum (pictured left) became increasingly widespread throughout the Imperial era, and eventually screw presses were commonly used to produce olive oil from Spain to the eastern Mediterranean. Many ancient presses still exist in the Eastern Mediterranean region, and some dating to the Roman period are still used today. Productivity was greatly improved by Joseph Graham's development of the hydraulic pressing system in 1795.

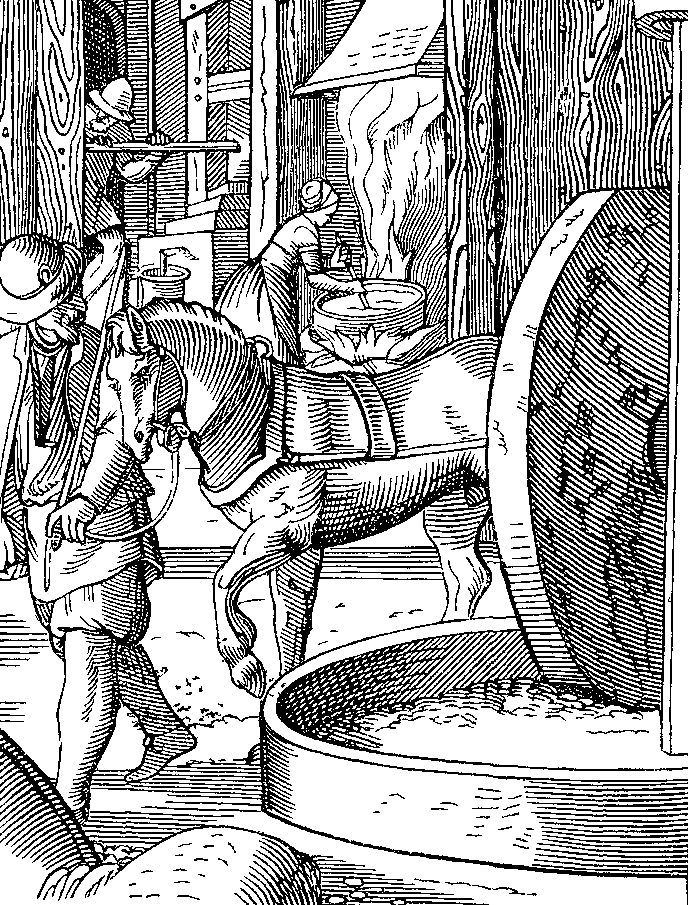
The Manufacture of Oil, 16th-century engraving by Jost Amman

=== Symbolism and mythology ===
The olive tree has historically been a symbol of peace between nations. It has played a religious and social role in Greek mythology, especially concerning the city of Athens, named after the goddess Athena because her gift of an olive tree was held to be more precious than rival Poseidon's gift of a salt spring.

== Varieties ==
There are many olive cultivars, each with a particular flavor, texture, and shelf life that make them more or less suitable for different applications, such as direct human consumption on bread or in salads, indirect consumption in domestic cooking or catering, or industrial uses such as animal feed or engineering applications. During the stages of maturity, olive fruit changes color from green to violet, and then black. Olive oil taste characteristics depend on the stage of ripeness at which olive fruits are collected.

== Uses ==
=== Food ===
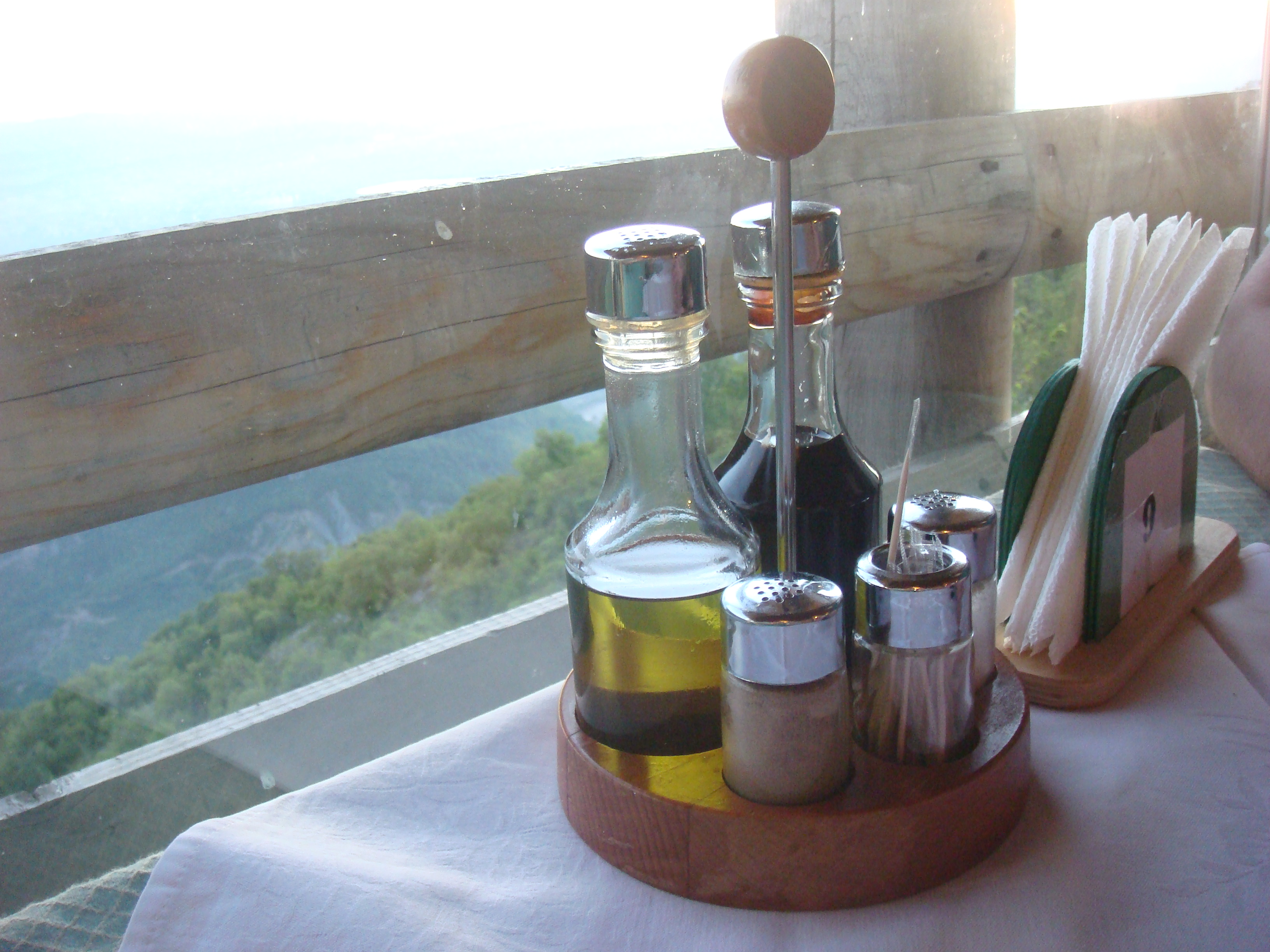
Vinegar and olive oil

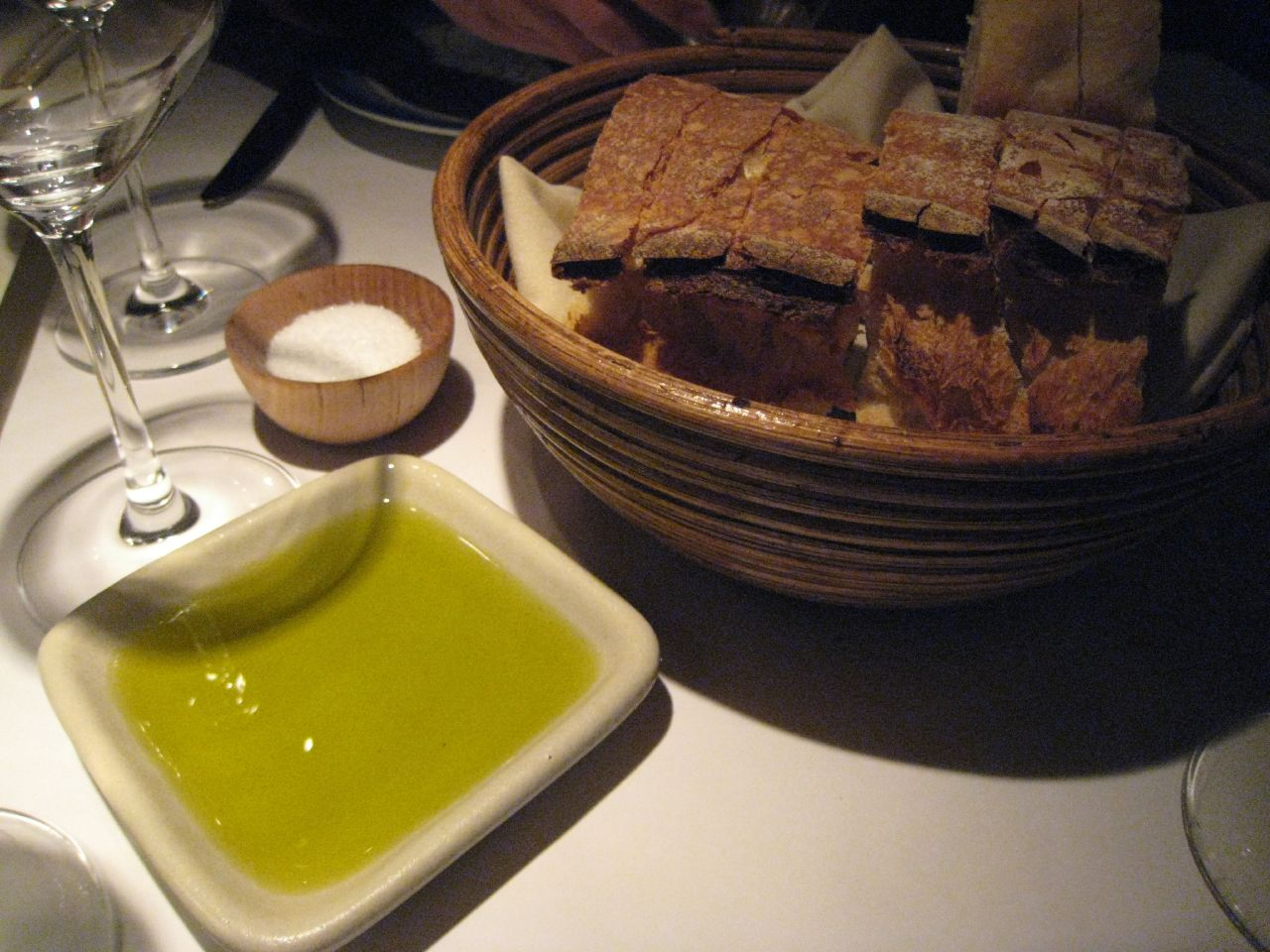
Olive oil served with bread

Olive oil is an important cooking oil in countries surrounding the Mediterranean, and it forms one of the three staple food plants of Mediterranean cuisine, the other two being wheat (as in pasta, bread, and couscous), and the grape, used as a dessert fruit and for wine.

Extra virgin olive oil is mostly used raw as a condiment and as an ingredient in salad dressings. If uncompromised by heat, the flavor is stronger. It can also be used for sautéing.

When extra virgin olive oil is heated above 210–216 °C (410–421 °F), depending on its free fatty acid content, the unrefined particles within the oil are burned. This leads to a deteriorated taste. Refined olive oils are suited for deep frying because of the higher smoke point and milder flavour. Extra virgin oils have a smoke point around 180–215 °C (356–419 °F), with higher-quality oils having a higher smoke point, whereas refined light olive oil has a smoke point up to 230 °C (446 °F). That they can be used for deep frying is contrary to the common misconception that there are no olive oils with a smoke point as high as many other vegetable oils. In the misconception, heating at these high temperatures is theorised to impact taste or nutrition.

=== Religious ===
==== Christianity ====
Various Christian churches use olive oil as part of consecration ceremonies, such as administering certain sacraments and ecclesiastical functions. The Church of Jesus Christ of Latter-day Saints uses pure olive oil that the priesthood has blessed (consecrated) for anointing the sick.

==== Judaism ====
In Jewish observance, olive oil was the only fuel permitted for use in the seven-branched menorah used in the service of the Mishkan the Exodus of the Tribes of Israel from Egypt, and later in the permanent Temple in Jerusalem. According to biblical law, the oil used for the menorah had to be pure olive oil produced by the first pressing of the olives, traditionally obtained by gently crushing them so that only the first oil was collected.

Olive oil plays a central role in the story of Hanukkah, which commemorates the rededication of the Temple following the Maccabean Revolt. According to Jewish tradition, a single cruse of consecrated oil, enough for one day, miraculously burned for eight days in the Temple menorah. In modern observance of Hanukkah, candles are commonly used to light the Hanukkah menorah, though olive oil lamps are often preferred by some communities in order to more closely replicate the original Temple practice.

In ancient Israelite religion, olive oil was a key ingredient in the sacred holy anointing oil described in the Hebrew Bible. This oil was used to ritually consecrate priests, kings, prophets, and sacred objects, symbolizing divine selection and sanctification.

==== Islam ====
Olive oil is used in Islam for both spiritual and practical purposes, with guidance found in the Qur'an, Sunnah and traditional prophetic medicine. In Sura At- Tin; Chapter 95 of Al Qur'an Allah swears by Olives and Figs. Furthermore, An- Nur (24:35) uses Olive oil as a symbol of divine light representing its spiritual significance in Islam. Allah says, "And [we brought forward a tree] issuing from Mount Sinai which produces oil and Food [i.e olive] for those who eat."(Al Qur'an 23:20) Moreover Prophet Muhammad has emphasized benefits of olive oil highlighting role in nutritional and external benefits of human body. He said, "Eat the oil (olive) and use it on your skin and hair, for it comes from the blessed tree"(tirmidhi). Olive oil is used as a medium for Ruqyah. Some scholars and practitioners recommend reciting Qur'an and then applying or ingesting it as a part of Ruqyah. Olive oil is given as charity, especially around Ramadan.

== Extraction ==
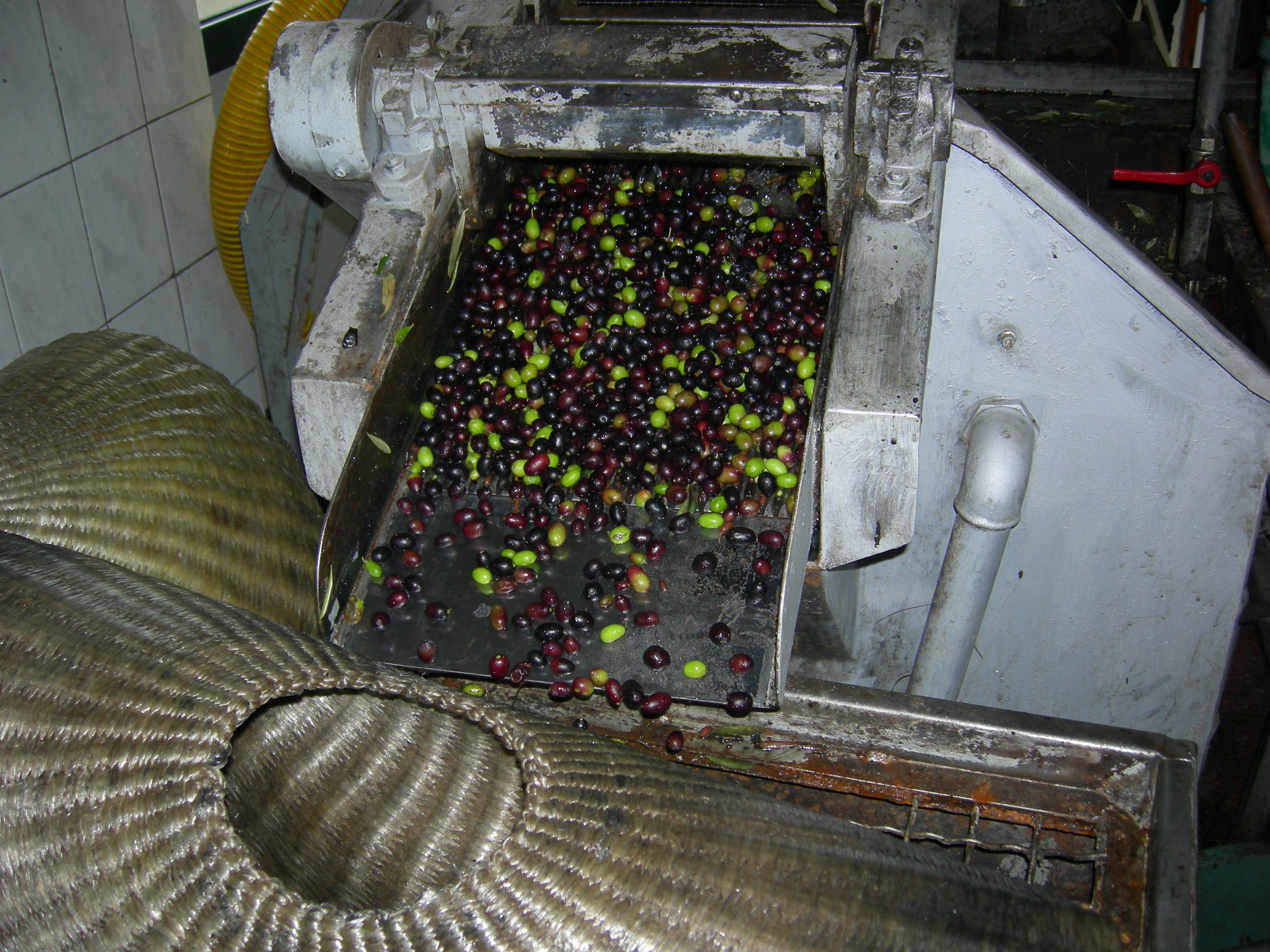
Olive oil mill

Olive oil is produced by grinding ripe olives and extracting the oil by mechanical or chemical means. Underripe olives usually produce undesirably bitter oil, and overripe olives can produce oil with fermentation defects. The process is generally as follows:

1. The olives are ground into paste, traditionally by large millstones, or by modern hammer, blade, or disk mill.
2. If ground with millstones, the olive paste generally stays under the stones for 30 to 40 minutes. Shorter grinding may produce a more raw paste that produces less oil and has a less ripe taste; a longer process may increase oxidation of the paste and reduce the flavor. Modern grinders reduce the olives to paste in seconds. After grinding, the paste is stirred for 20 to 30 minutes in a particular container—malaxation—where the microscopic oil drops aggregate into larger drops, facilitating mechanical extraction.
3. After grinding, the olive paste is spread on fiber disks stacked in a column and placed into the press. The column is then pressed to extract the vegetal liquid—oil and water—from the paste. Traditionally, the oil was separated from the water, very slowly, by gravity, as oil is less dense than water. This slow process has been replaced by much faster centrifugation. The centrifuges have one exit for the (heavier) watery part and one for the oil. Olive oil should not contain significant traces of vegetal water, as this accelerates organic degeneration by microorganisms. Separation is not always perfect in smaller oil mills, leading to a small watery deposit containing organic particles at the bottom of oil bottles.
  The oil produced by these mechanical means only is called virgin oil. Extra virgin olive oil also satisfies specific chemical and organoleptic criteria: low free acidity, no or very few organoleptic defects. A higher-grade extra virgin olive oil is mostly dependent on favourable weather conditions; a drought during the flowering phase, for example, can result in a lower quality (virgin) oil. Olive trees produce well every couple of years, so greater harvests occur in alternate years (the year in between is when the tree yields less). However, the quality is still dependent on the weather.
4. Sometimes the produced oil is filtered to remove remaining solid particles that may reduce the shelf life of the product. Labels may indicate that the oil has not been filtered, suggesting a different taste. Fresh unfiltered olive oil usually has a slightly cloudy appearance. This form of olive oil used to be popular only among small-scale producers but is now becoming "trendy", in line with consumers' demand for products perceived to be less processed. However, if not used shortly after production, unfiltered olive oil will deteriorate faster: "Some producers maintain that extra-virgin olive oils do not need filtration but also that filtration is detrimental to oil quality. This point of view should be considered erroneous and probably the result of the improper implementation of this operation. In fact, fine particles that are suspended in a virgin olive oil, even after the most effective centrifugal finishing, contain water and enzymes that may impair oil stability and ruin its sensory profile. ... Filtration makes an extra-virgin olive oil more stable and also more attractive. If the suspended particles are not removed, they slowly agglomerate and flocculate, forming a deposit on the bottom of the storage containers. Such a deposit continues to be at risk of enzymatic spoilage and, in the worst case, of the development of anaerobic micro-organisms with further spoilage and hygienic risk. ... It is ... recommended that filtration be carried out as soon as possible after centrifugal separation and finishing."

=== Ancient Levant ===
In the ancient Levant, three methods were used to produce different grades of olive oil. The finest oil was produced from fully developed and ripe olives harvested solely from the apex of the tree and lightly pressed, "for what flows from light pressure is very sweet and very thin". The remaining olives, of varying ripeness, are pressed with a heavier weight. Inferior oil is produced from unripe olives that are stored for extended periods until they grow soft or begin to shrivel to become more fit for grinding. Others are left for extended periods in pits in the ground to induce sweating and decay before they are ground. According to the Geoponica, salt and a little nitre are added when oil is stored.

In the Levant in medieval times a sharp-tasting green oil known as anpeqinon (Ancient Greek: ὀμφάκιον, ὀμφάχινον; Arabic: زيت الأنفاق), a corruption of the Latin words oleum omphacium, was sometimes extracted from unripe olives and used in cuisine and medicine.

=== Pomace handling ===
The remaining semi-solid waste, called pomace, retains a small quantity (about 5–10%) of "pomace oil" that cannot be extracted by further pressing, but only with chemical solvents. This is done in specialized chemical plants, not in the oil mills. Since the ancient Roman period, pomace was commonly used as a domestic and industrial fuel source, burning at a high temperature for longer and with less smoke than charcoal.

Handling of olive waste is an environmental challenge because the wastewater, millions of tons (billions of liters) annually in the European Union, has low biodegradability, is toxic to plants, and cannot be processed through conventional water treatment systems. Traditionally, olive pomace would be used as compost or developed as a possible biofuel, although these uses introduce concern due to chemicals present in the pomace. A process called "valorization" of olive pomace is under research and development, consisting of additional processing to obtain value-added byproducts, such as animal feed, food additives for human products, and phenolic and fatty acid extracts for potential human use.

== Market ==
=== Production ===
Olive oil production 2022, tonnes
Spain	665,709
Italy	331,038
Greece	313,300
Turkey	302,400
Tunisia	235,200
Syria	189,423
Morocco	181,500
Portugal	137,753
World	2,743,216
Source: FAOSTAT of the United Nations

In 2022, world production of olive oil was 2.7 million tonnes, led by Spain with 24% of the total (table). Other major producers were Italy, Greece, Turkey, and Tunisia (table).

Villacarrillo, Jaén, Andalucía, Spain, is a centre of olive oil production. 75% of Spain's olive oil production derives from the region of Andalucía, particularly within Jaén province which produces 70% of the olive oil in Spain. The world's largest olive oil mill (almazara, in Spanish), capable of processing 2,500 tonnes of olives per day, is in the town of Villacarrillo, Jaén.

Italian major producers are the regions of Calabria and, above all, Apulia. Many PDO and PGI extra-virgin olive oils are produced in these regions. Extra-virgin olive oil is also produced in Tuscany, in cities including Lucca, Florence, and Siena, which are also included in the association of Città dell'Olio. Italy imports about 65% of Spanish olive oil exports.

Olive oil production

Yearly per capita supply of olive oil

=== Consumption ===
Greece has the highest per capita consumption of olive oil worldwide, around 24 liters per year. Consumption in Spain is 15 liters; Italy 13 liters; and Syria, around 3 liters. Canada consumes 1.5 liters and the US 1 liter.

The FAO lists different statistics in 2023, namely for Spain (9 kg), Greece (8.8 kg), and Italy (8.6 kg). The three countries remain by far the biggest per capita consumers of olive oil.

== Regulation ==
The International Olive Council (IOC) is an intergovernmental organisation of states that produce olives or products derived from olives, such as olive oil. The IOC officially governs 95% of international production and influences the rest. The EU regulates the use of different protected designation of origin labels for olive oils.

The United States is not a member of the IOC and is not subject to its authority, but on October 25, 2010, the U.S. Department of Agriculture adopted new voluntary olive oil grading standards that closely parallel those of the IOC, with some adjustments for the characteristics of olives grown in the U.S. U.S. Customs regulations on "country of origin" state that if a non-origin nation is shown on the label, then the real origin must be shown on the same side of the label in letters of comparable size, so as not to mislead the consumer. Yet most major U.S. brands continue to put "imported from Italy" on the front label in large letters and other origins on the back in very small print. "In fact, olive oil labeled 'Italian' often comes from Turkey, Tunisia, Morocco, Spain, and Greece." This makes it unclear what percentage of the olive oil is really of Italian origin.

=== Commercial grades ===
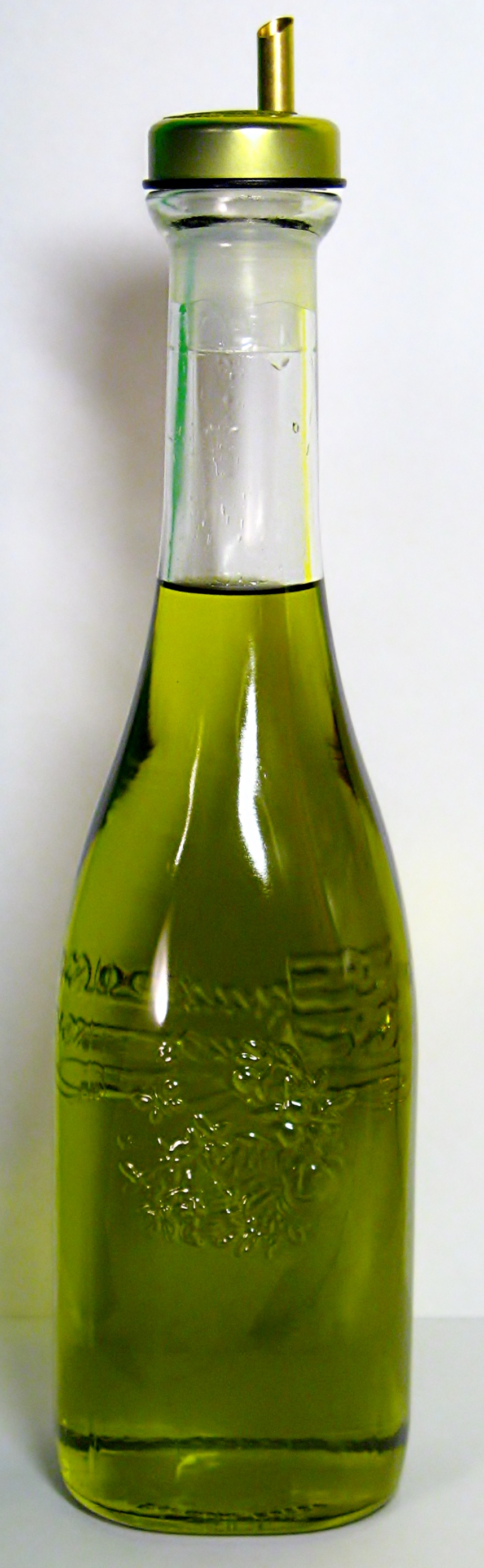
A bottle of Italian olive oil

All production begins by crushing or pressing the olive fruit to transform it into olive paste. This paste is malaxed (slowly churned or mixed) to allow the microscopic oil droplets to agglomerate. The oil is then separated from the watery matter and fruit pulp with the use of a press (traditional method) or centrifugation (modern method). The residue that remains after pressing or centrifugation can also produce a small amount of oil, called pomace.

One parameter used to characterise an oil is its acidity. In this context, "acidity" is not chemical acidity in the sense of pH, but the percent (measured by weight) of free oleic acid. Olive oil acidity is a measure of the hydrolysis of the oil's triglycerides: as the oil degrades and becomes oxidized, more fatty acids are freed from the glycerides, increasing the level of free acidity and thereby increasing hydrolytic rancidity. Rancidity not only impacts the taste and color but also its nutritional value.

Another measure of the oil's chemical degradation is the peroxide value, which measures the degree to which the oil is oxidized by free radicals, leading to oxidative rancidity. Phenolic acids present in olive oil also add acidic sensory properties to aroma and flavor.

The grades of oil extracted from the olive fruit can be classified as:

- Virgin means the oil was produced by the use of mechanical means only, with no chemical treatment. The term virgin oil with reference to production method includes all grades of virgin olive oil, including extra virgin, virgin, ordinary virgin and Lampante virgin olive oil products, depending on quality (see below).
- Lampante virgin oil is olive oil extracted by virgin (mechanical) methods but not suitable for human consumption without further refining; "lampante" is the attributive form of "lampa", the Italian word for "lamp", referring to the use of such oil in oil lamps. Lampante virgin oil can be used for industrial purposes, or refined (see below) to make it edible.
- Refined olive oil is olive oil obtained from any grade of virgin olive oil by refining methods that do not lead to alterations in the initial glyceridic structure. The refining process removes color, odor, and flavour from the olive oil, and leaves behind a very pure form of olive oil that is tasteless, colorless, odorless, and extremely low in free fatty acids. Olive oils sold as the grades extra virgin olive oil and virgin olive oil therefore cannot contain any refined oil.
- Crude olive pomace oil is the oil obtained by treating olive pomace (the leftover paste after the pressing of olives for virgin olive oils) with solvents or other physical treatments, to the exclusion of oils obtained by re-esterification processes and of any mixture with other kinds of oils. It is then further refined into refined olive pomace oil and once re-blended with virgin olive oils for taste, is then known as olive pomace oil.

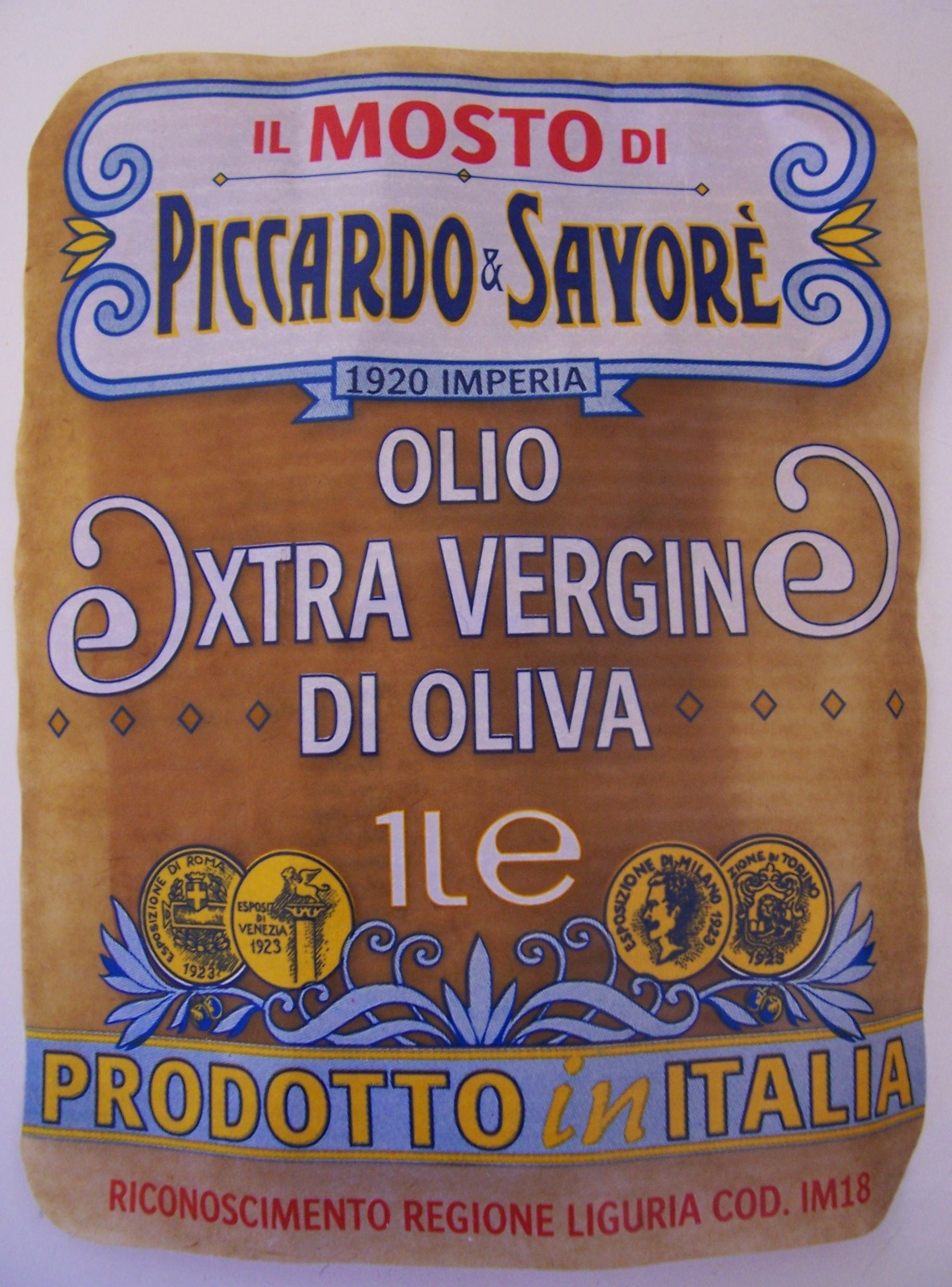
Italian label for "extra vergine" olive oil

==== International Olive Council ====
In countries that adhere to the standards of the International Olive Council, as well as in Australia, and under the voluntary United States Department of Agriculture labeling standards in the United States:

Extra virgin olive oil is the highest grade of virgin olive oil derived by cold mechanical extraction without use of solvents or refining methods. It contains no more than 0.8% free acidity, and is judged to have a superior taste, having some fruitiness and no defined sensory defects. Extra virgin olive oil accounts for less than 10% of oil in many producing countries; the percentage is far higher in some Mediterranean countries.

The International Olive Council requires the median of the fruity attribute to be higher than zero for a given olive oil in order to meet the criteria of extra virgin olive oil classification.

Virgin olive oil is a lesser grade of virgin oil, with free acidity of up to 2.0%, and is judged to have a good taste, but may include some sensory defects.

Refined olive oil is virgin oil refined using charcoal and other chemical and physical filters, methods which do not alter the glyceridic structure. It has a free acidity, expressed as oleic acid, of not more than 0.3 grams per 100 grams (0.3%), and its other characteristics correspond to those fixed for this category in this standard. It is obtained by refining virgin oils to eliminate high acidity or organoleptic defects. Oils labeled as pure olive oil or olive oil are primarily refined olive oil, with a small addition of virgin oil for taste.

Olive pomace oil is refined pomace olive oil, often blended with some virgin oil. It is fit for consumption, but may not be described simply as olive oil. It has a more neutral flavor than pure or virgin olive oil, making it less desirable to users concerned with flavor; however, it has the same fat composition as regular olive oil, giving it the same health benefits. It also has a high smoke point, and consequently is widely used in restaurants and home cooking in some countries.

==== United States ====
The United States is not a member of the IOC and does not implement its grades, but on October 25, 2010, the United States Department of Agriculture (USDA) established Standards for Grades of Olive Oil and Olive-Pomace Oil which closely parallel the IOC standards:

- U.S. extra virgin olive oil for oil with excellent flavor and odor and free fatty acid content of not more than 0.8 g per 100 g (0.8%);
- U.S. virgin olive oil for oil with reasonably good flavor and odor and free fatty acid content of not more than 2 g per 100 g (2%);
- U.S. virgin olive oil Not Fit For Human Consumption Without Further Processing is a virgin (mechanically extracted) olive oil of poor flavor and odor, equivalent to the IOC's lampante oil;
- U.S. olive oil is a mixture of virgin and refined oils;
- U.S. refined olive oil is an oil made from refined oils with some restrictions on the processing.

These grades are voluntary. Certification is available, for a fee, from the USDA.

In 2014, California adopted a set of olive oil standards for olive oil made from California-grown olives. The California Department of Food and Agriculture Grade and Labeling Standards for Olive Oil, Refined-Olive Oil, and Olive-Pomace Oil are mandatory for producers of more than 5,000 gallons of California olive oil. This joins other official state, federal, and international olive oil standards.

Several olive producer associations, such as the North American Olive Oil Association and the California Olive Oil Council, also offer grading and certification within the United States. Oleologist Nicholas Coleman suggests that the California Olive Oil Council certification is the most stringent of the voluntary grading schemes in the United States.

Country of origin can be established by one or two-letter country codes printed on the bottle or label. Country codes include I=Italy, GR=Greece, E=Spain, TU=Tunisia, MA=Morocco, CL=Chile, AG=Argentina, AU=Australia.

=== Label wording ===
- Different names for olive oil indicate the degree of processing the oil has undergone as well as the quality of the oil. Extra virgin olive oil is the highest grade available, followed by virgin olive oil. The word "virgin" indicates that the olives have been pressed to extract the oil; no heat or chemicals have been used during the extraction process, and the oil is pure and unrefined. Virgin olive oils contain the highest levels of polyphenols, antioxidants that have been linked with better health.
- Olive Oil, which is sometimes denoted as being "Made from refined and virgin olive oils" is a blend of refined olive oil with a virgin grade of olive oil. Pure, Classic, Light and Extra-Light are terms introduced by manufacturers in countries that are non-traditional consumers of olive oil for these products to indicate both their composition of being only 100% olive oil, and also the varying strength of taste to consumers. Contrary to a common consumer belief, they do not have fewer calories than extra virgin oil, as implied by the names.
- Cold pressed or Cold extraction means "that the oil was not heated over a certain temperature (usually 27 °C (80 °F)) during processing, thus retaining more nutrients and undergoing less degradation". The difference between Cold Extraction and Cold Pressed is regulated in Europe, where the use of a centrifuge, the modern method of extraction for large quantities, must be labelled as Cold Extracted, while only a physically pressed olive oil may be labelled as Cold Pressed. In many parts of the world, such as Australia, producers using centrifugal extraction still label their products as Cold Pressed.
- First cold pressed means "that the fruit of the olive was crushed exactly one time – i.e., the first press. The cold refers to the temperature range of the fruit at the time it is crushed". In Calabria (Italy) the olives are collected in October. In regions like Tuscany or Liguria, the olives collected in November and ground, often at night, are too cold to be processed efficiently without heating. The paste is regularly heated above the environmental temperatures, which may be as low as 10–15 °C, to extract the oil efficiently with only physical means. Olives pressed in warm regions like Southern Italy or Northern Africa may be pressed at significantly higher temperatures, although not heated. While it is important that the pressing temperatures be as low as possible (generally below 25 °C) there is no international reliable definition of "cold pressed".
  Furthermore, there is no "second" press of virgin oil, so the term "first press" means only that the oil was produced in a press vs. other possible methods.
- Protected designation of origin (PDO) and protected geographical indication (PGI) refer to olive oils with "exceptional properties and quality derived from their place of origin as well as from the way of their production".
- The label may indicate that the oil was bottled or packed in a stated country. This does not necessarily mean that the oil was produced there. The origin of the oil may sometimes be marked elsewhere on the label; it may be a mixture of oils from multiple countries.
- The U.S. Food and Drug Administration permitted a claim on olive oil labels stating: "Limited and not conclusive scientific evidence suggests that eating about two tablespoons (23 g) of olive oil daily may reduce the risk of coronary heart disease."

=== Adulteration ===
There have been allegations, particularly in Italy and Spain, that regulation can be sometimes lax and corrupt. Major shippers are claimed to routinely adulterate olive oil so that only about 40% of olive oil sold as "extra virgin" in Italy actually meets the specification. In some cases, colza oil (extracted from rapeseed) with added color and flavor has been labeled and sold as olive oil. This extensive fraud prompted the Italian government to mandate a new labeling law in 2007 for companies selling olive oil, under which every bottle of Italian olive oil would have to declare the farm and press on which it was produced, as well as display a precise breakdown of the oils used, for blended oils. In February 2008, however, EU officials took issue with the new law, stating that under EU rules such labeling should be voluntary rather than compulsory. Under EU rules, olive oil may be sold as Italian even if it only contains a small amount of Italian oil.

Extra-virgin olive oil has strict requirements and is checked for "sensory defects" that include: rancid, fusty, musty, winey (vinegary), and muddy sediment. These defects can occur for different reasons. The most common are:

- Raw material (olives) infected or battered
- Inadequate harvest, with contact between the olives and soil

In March 2008, 400 Italian police officers conducted Operation Golden Oil, arresting 23 people and confiscating 85 farms after an investigation revealed a large-scale scheme to relabel oils from other Mediterranean nations as Italian. In April 2008, another operation impounded seven olive oil plants and arrested 40 people in nine provinces of northern and southern Italy for adding chlorophyll to sunflower and soya bean oil and selling it as extra virgin olive oil, both in Italy and abroad; 25,000 liters of the fake oil were seized and prevented from being exported.

On March 15, 2011, the prosecutor's office in Florence, Italy, working in conjunction with the forestry department, indicted two managers and an officer of Carapelli, one of the brands of the Spanish company Grupo SOS (which recently changed its name to Deoleo). The charges involved falsified documents and food fraud. Carapelli lawyer Neri Pinucci said the company was not worried about the charges and that "the case is based on an irregularity in the documents."

In February 2012, Spanish authorities investigated an international olive oil fraud in which palm, avocado, sunflower, and other cheaper oils were passed off as Italian olive oil. Police said the oils were blended in an industrial biodiesel plant and adulterated in a way to hide markers that would have revealed their true nature. The oils were not toxic and posed no health risk, according to a statement by the Guardia Civil. Nineteen people were arrested following the year-long joint probe by the police and Spanish tax authorities, as part of Operation Lucerna.

Using tiny print to state the origin of blended oil is used as a legal loophole by manufacturers of adulterated and mixed olive oil.

Journalist Tom Mueller has investigated crime and adulteration in the olive oil business, publishing the article "Slippery Business" in New Yorker magazine, followed by the 2011 book Extra Virginity. On 3 January 2016 Bill Whitaker presented a program on CBS News including interviews with Mueller and with Italian authorities. It was reported that in the previous month, 5,000 tons of adulterated olive oil had been sold in Italy, and that organised crime was heavily involved—the term "Agrimafia" was used. The point was made by Mueller that the profit margin on adulterated olive oil was three times that on the illegal narcotic drug cocaine. He said that over 50% of olive oil sold in Italy was adulterated, as was 75–80% of that sold in the US. Whitaker reported that three samples of "extra virgin olive oil" had been bought in a US supermarket and tested; two of the three samples did not meet the required standard, and one of them—from a top-selling US brand—was exceptionally poor.

In early February 2017, the Carabinieri police arrested 33 suspects in the Calabrian mafia's Piromalli 'ndrina ('Ndrangheta), which was allegedly exporting fake extra virgin olive oil to the U.S.; the product was actually inexpensive olive pomace oil fraudulently labeled. Less than a year earlier, the American television program 60 Minutes had warned that "the olive oil business has been corrupted by the Mafia" and that "Agromafia" was a 16 billion dollar per year enterprise. A Carabinieri investigator interviewed on the program said that "olive oil fraud has gone on for the better part of four millennia" but today, it's particularly "easy for the bad guys to either introduce adulterated olive oils or mix in lower quality olive oils with extra-virgin olive oil". Weeks later, a report by Forbes magazine stated that "it's reliably reported that 80% of the Italian olive oil on the [US] market is fraudulent" and that "a massive olive oil scandal is being uncovered in Southern Italy (Puglia, Umbria and Campania)".

In July 2024, the European Union reported a significant increase in olive oil fraud and mislabeling cases. The European Commission's annual report on food fraud revealed that olive oil remained one of the most frequently adulterated food products, with incidents reaching a record high that year.

== Constituents ==
General chemical structure of food fats (triglyceride). R^{1}, R^{2}, and R^{3} are alkyl groups (approx. 20%) or alkenyl groups (approx. 80%).

Olive oil is composed mainly of the mixed triglyceride esters of oleic acid, linoleic acid, palmitic acid and of other fatty acids, along with traces of squalene (up to 0.7%) and sterols (about 0.2% phytosterol and tocosterols). The composition varies by cultivar, region, altitude, time of harvest, and extraction process.

Fatty acid	Type	Percentage (m/m methyl esters)	Ref.
Oleic acid	Monounsaturated	55 to 83%	
Linoleic acid	Polyunsaturated (omega-6)	3.5 to 21%	
Palmitic acid	Saturated	7.5 to 20%	
Stearic acid	Saturated	0.5 to 5%	
α-Linolenic acid	Polyunsaturated (omega-3)	0 to 1.5%	

=== Comparison to other vegetable oils ===
Properties of vegetable oils The nutritional values are expressed as percent (%) by mass of total fat.
Type	Processing treatment	Saturated fatty acids	Monounsaturated fatty acids		Polyunsaturated fatty acids				Smoke point
Type	Processing treatment	Saturated fatty acids	Total	Oleic acid (ω−9)	Total	α-Linolenic acid (ω−3)	Linoleic acid (ω−6)	ω−6:3 ratio	Smoke point
Avocado		11.6	70.6	67.9	13.5	1	12.5	12.5:1	250 °C (482 °F)
Brazil nut		17.6	26.7	26.1	55.7	0.1	55.6	457:1	208 °C (406 °F)
Canola		7.4	63.3	61.8	28.1	9.1	18.6	2:1	204 °C (400 °F)
Coconut		82.5	6.3	6	1.7	0.019	1.68	88:1	175 °C (347 °F)
Corn		12.9	27.6	27.3	54.7	1	58	58:1	232 °C (450 °F)
Cottonseed		25.9	17.8	19	51.9	1	54	54:1	216 °C (420 °F)
Cottonseed	hydrogenated	93.6	1.5		0.6	0.2	0.3	1.5:1	
Flaxseed/linseed		9.0	18.4	18	67.8	53	13	0.2:1	107 °C (225 °F)
Grape seed		9.6	16.1	15.8	69.9	0.10	69.6	very high	216 °C (421 °F)
Hemp seed		7.0	9.0	9.0	82.0	22.0	54.0	2.5:1	166 °C (330 °F)
High-oleic safflower oil		7.5	75.2	75.2	12.8	0	12.8	very high	212 °C (414 °F)
Olive (extra virgin)		13.8	73.0	71.3	10.5	0.7	9.8	14:1	193 °C (380 °F)
Palm		49.3	37.0	40	9.3	0.2	9.1	45.5:1	235 °C (455 °F)
Palm	hydrogenated	88.2	5.7		0				
Peanut		16.2	57.1	55.4	19.9	0.318	19.6	61.6:1	232 °C (450 °F)
Rice bran oil		25	38.4	38.4	36.6	2.2	34.4	15.6:1	232 °C (450 °F)
Sesame		14.2	39.7	39.3	41.7	0.3	41.3	138:1	
Soybean		15.6	22.8	22.6	57.7	7	51	7.3:1	238 °C (460 °F)
Soybean	partially hydrogenated	14.9	43.0	42.5	37.6	2.6	34.9	13.4:1	
Sunflower oil		8.99	63.4	62.9	20.7	0.16	20.5	128:1	227 °C (440 °F)
Walnut oil	unrefined	9.1	22.8	22.2	63.3	10.4	52.9	5:1	160 °C (320 °F)

=== Phenolic composition ===
Olive oil contains traces of polyphenols (about 0.5%), such as esters of tyrosol, hydroxytyrosol, oleocanthal, and oleuropein, which give olive oil a slightly bitter taste and characteristic aroma. Olive oil contains numerous polyphenols, among which are elenolic acid, a marker for maturation of olives, and alpha-tocopherol, a vitamin E compound. Oleuropein, together with other closely related compounds such as 10-hydroxyoleuropein, ligstroside and 10-hydroxyligstroside, are tyrosol esters of elenolic acid. Other phenolic constituents include flavonoids, lignans, and pinoresinol.

Polyphenols, which are beneficial to health, are vulnerable to degradation largely by heat. Extraction of cold-pressed olive oil at temperatures below 25 °C (the maximum permitted for cold-pressed oil is 27 °C), improves retention of polyphenols, as does processing just hours after harvesting, harvesting early, avoiding prolonged mixing, and minimising exposure to oxygen. Some measures to preserve polyphenol content reduce yield. In use, prolonged storage reduces polyphenol concentration; storage in a dark glass container at or below 15 °C, or even refrigeration, is better. When oil is used for cooking rather than at room temperature, polyphenol content decreases with temperature, dropping significantly at 150 °C.

A peppery or bitter taste indicates higher polyphenol content.

== Nutrition ==
Olive oil
Nutritional value per 100 g (3.5 oz)
- Energy: 3,700 kJ (880 kcal)
- Carbohydrates: 0 g
- Fat: 100 g
- Saturated: 13.8 g
- Monounsaturated: 73 g
- Polyunsaturated omega−3 omega−6: 10.5 g 0.8 g 9.8 g
- Protein: 0 g
Vitamins and minerals
Vitamins	Quantity %DV^{†}
Vitamin E	96% 14.4 mg
Vitamin K	50% 60.2 μg
- Other constituents: Quantity
- Water: 0 g
- Full Link to USDA Database entry
- ^{†}Percentages estimated using US recommendations for adults.

Olive oil is 100% fat, containing no carbohydrates, dietary fiber, protein or water (table).

In a reference amount of 100 grams (3.5 oz), olive oil supplies 884 kcals of food energy, and is a rich source (20% or more of the Daily Value, DV) of vitamin E (96% DV) and vitamin K (50% DV) (table).

One tablespoon (13.5 g) of olive oil supplies 119 calories of food energy and contains 13.5 g of fat, including 9.9 g of monounsaturated fat (mainly as oleic acid), 1.4 g of polyunsaturated fat (mainly as linoleic acid), and 1.9 g of saturated fat (mainly as palmitic acid) (see pick list from table reference).

== Potential health effects ==
In the United States, the FDA allows producers of olive oil to place the following qualified health claim on product labels:

Limited and not conclusive scientific evidence suggests that eating about 2 tbsp. (23 g) of olive oil daily may reduce the risk of coronary heart disease due to the monounsaturated fat in olive oil. To achieve this possible benefit, olive oil is to replace a similar amount of saturated fat and not increase the overall number of calories consumed in a day.

In a review by the European Food Safety Authority (EFSA) in 2011, health claims on olive oil were approved for protection by its polyphenols against oxidation of blood lipids, and for maintenance of normal blood LDL-cholesterol levels by replacing saturated fats in the diet with oleic acid. (See also: Commission Regulation (EU) 432/2012 of 16 May 2012). Despite its approval, the EFSA has noted that a definitive cause-and-effect relationship has not been adequately established for consumption of olive oil and maintaining normal (fasting) blood concentrations of triglycerides, normal blood HDL-cholesterol concentrations, and normal blood glucose concentrations.

A 2014 meta-analysis concluded that increased consumption of olive oil was associated with reduced risk of all-cause mortality, cardiovascular events and stroke, while monounsaturated fatty acids of mixed animal and plant origin showed no significant effects. Another meta-analysis in 2018 found high-polyphenol olive oil intake was associated with improved measures of total cholesterol, HDL cholesterol, malondialdehyde, and oxidized LDL when compared to low-polyphenol olive oils, although it recommended longer studies, and more investigation of non-Mediterranean populations.

== See also ==
- Amurca – Byproduct of olive oil production
- List of ancient dishes and foods
- List of cuisines
- List of dips
