= Tyrosinol =

- L-Tyrosinol (left) and D-tyrosinol (right)

Names
- IUPAC name 4-(2-Amino-3-hydroxypropyl)phenol
- Other names β-amino-4-hydroxybenzenepropanol

Identifiers
| CAS Number | 500-88-9; L: 5034-68-4; D: 58889-64-8 |
| 3D model (JSmol) | Interactive image; L: Interactive image; D: Interactive image |
| ChemSpider | 477110; L: 133302 |
| PubChem CID | 548190; L: 151247; D: 2734052 |
| UNII | XFZ3JA6LZX |
| CompTox Dashboard (EPA) | L: DTXSID10198381; D: DTXSID30370102 |
- InChI: InChI=1S/C9H13NO2/c10-8(6-11)5-7-1-3-9(12)4-2-7/h1-4,8,11-12H,5-6,10H2 Key: DBLDQZASZZMNSL-UHFFFAOYSA-N; L: InChI=1S/C9H13NO2/c10-8(6-11)5-7-1-3-9(12)4-2-7/h1-4,8,11-12H,5-6,10H2/t8-/m0/s1 Key: DBLDQZASZZMNSL-QMMMGPOBSA-N; D: InChI=1S/C9H13NO2/c10-8(6-11)5-7-1-3-9(12)4-2-7/h1-4,8,11-12H,5-6,10H2/t8-/m1/s1 Key: DBLDQZASZZMNSL-MRVPVSSYSA-N
- SMILES: C(C(CO)N)C1=CC=C(O)C=C1; L: C1=CC(=CC=C1C[C@@H](CO)N)O; D: C1=CC(=CC=C1C[C@H](CO)N)O

Properties
| Chemical formula | C_{9}H_{13}NO_{2} |
| Molar mass | 167.208 g·mol^{−1} |
| Appearance | white solid |
| Melting point | 91.4–92.1 °C (196.5–197.8 °F; 364.5–365.2 K) |
- Except where otherwise noted, data are given for materials in their standard state (at 25 °C [77 °F], 100 kPa). Infobox references

Tyrosinol is an organic compound with the formula HOC_{6}H_{4}CH_{2}CH(NH_{2})CH_{2}OH. A colorless or white solid, it is produced by the reduction of the amino acid tyrosine with borane dimethylsulfide. The compound, which is chiral, is an example of a 1,2-ethanolamine as well as a phenethylamine.

== Related compounds ==
- Tyrosol, HOC_{6}H_{4}CH_{2}CH_{2}OH
