= Phenylethanoid =

Chemical compound

Tyrosol, a simple phenylethanoid.

Phenylethanoids are a type of phenolic compounds characterized by a phenethyl alcohol structure. Tyrosol and hydroxytyrosol are examples of such compounds.

== Glycosides ==
The red deadnettle (Lamium purpureum) contains phenylethanoid glycosides named lamiusides A, B, C, D and E. The aerial parts of Stachys officinalis contain phenylethanoid glycosides, (betonyosides A, B, C, D, E and F). Chemical investigation of methanol extracts from Pithecoctenium crucigerum (Bignoniaceae) showed the presence of five phenylethanoid glycosides (verbascoside, isoverbascoside, forsythoside B, jionoside D and leucosceptoside B), these all active against DPPH.

Verbascoside and echinacoside are phenylethanoid and phenylpropanoid hybrids forming ester bonds with sugars.
