= Amurca =

Byproduct of olive oil production

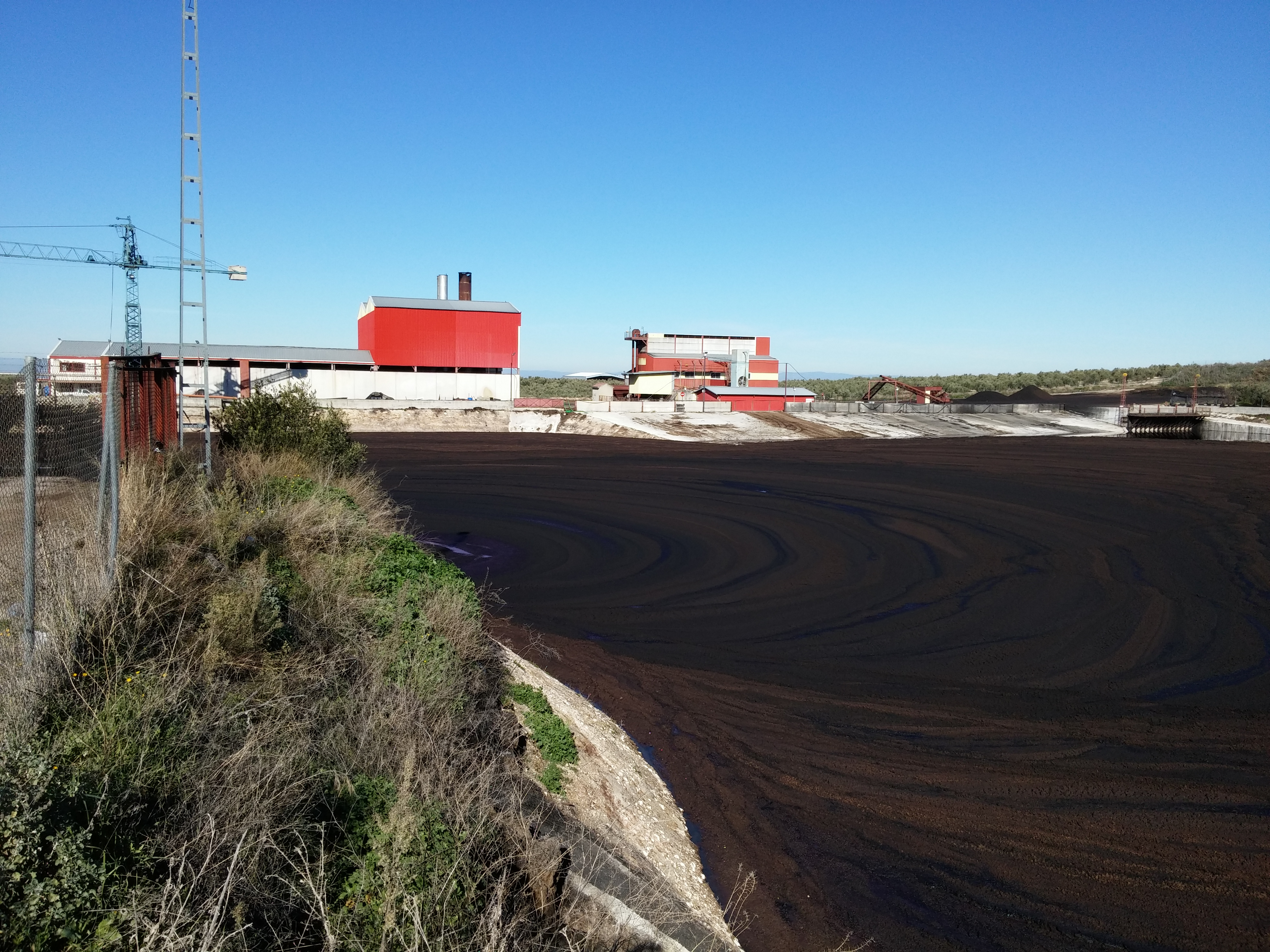
Amurca pit at one oil mill, in the province of Jaén.

Amurca is the Latin name for the bitter-tasting, dark-colored, watery sediment that settles out of unfiltered olive oil over time. It has been known in English as "olive oil lees" and recently as "olive mill waste water (OMWW)". Historically, amurca was used for numerous purposes, as first described by Cato the Elder in De Agri Cultura, and later by Pliny the Elder. Cato the Elder mentions its uses as a building material, pesticide, herbicide, dietary supplement for oxen and trees, food preservative, a maintenance product for leather, bronze vessel, and vases, and as a treatment for firewood in order to avoid smoke.
