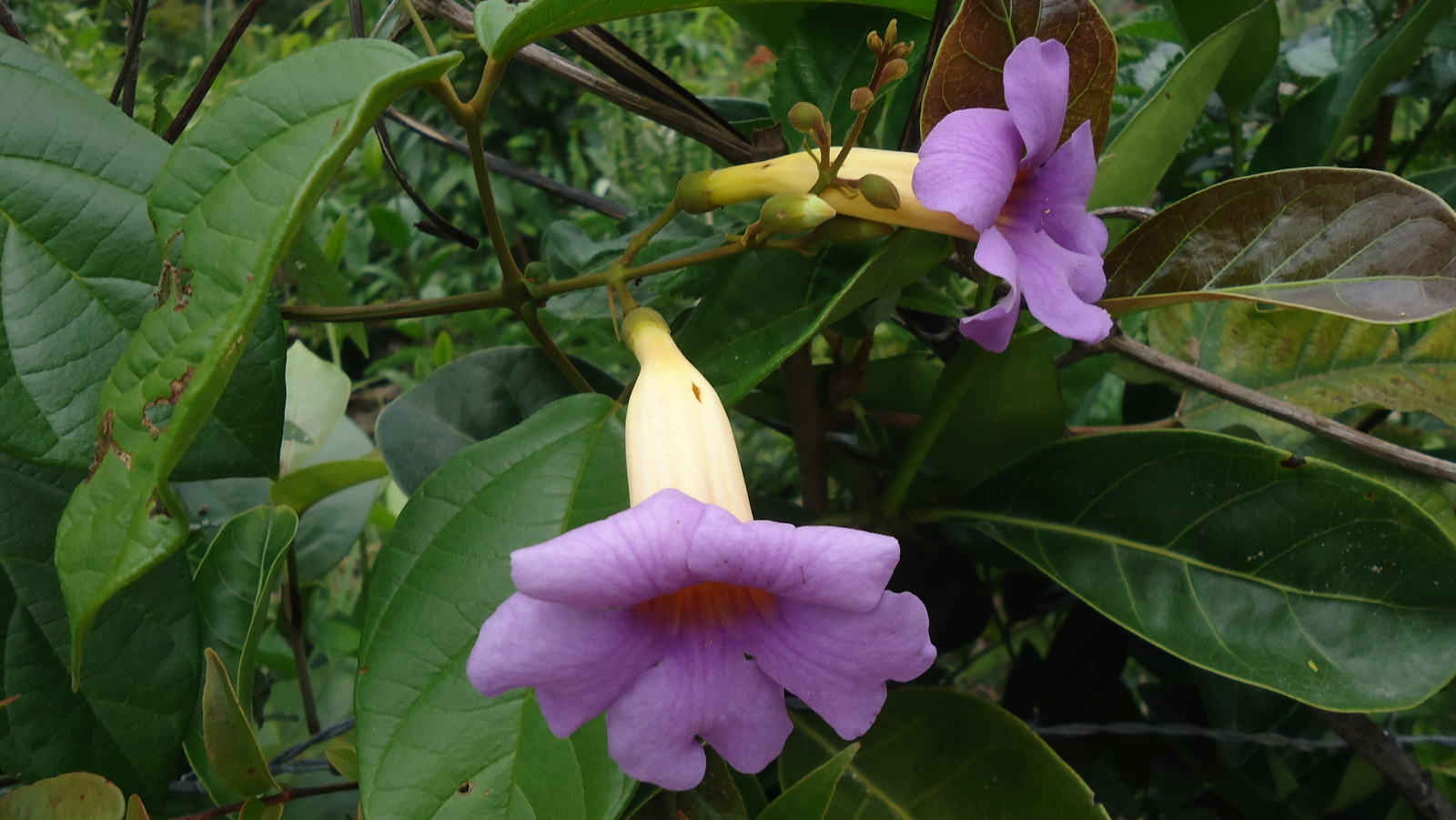
- Amphilophium scabriusculum

Scientific classification
- Kingdom: Plantae
- Clade: Tracheophytes
- Clade: Angiosperms
- Clade: Eudicots
- Clade: Asterids
- Order: Lamiales
- Family: Bignoniaceae
- Tribe: Bignonieae
- Genus: Amphilophium; Kunth

Species
- See text

Synonyms
- List: Anomoctenium Pichon; Bothriopodium Rizzini; Distictella Kuntze in T.E.von Post & C.E.O.Kuntze; Distictis Bureau; Distictis Mart. ex Meisn.; Endoloma Raf.; Glaziova Bureau; Haplolophium Cham.; Leiogyne K.Schum. in C.F.P.von Martius & auct. suc. (eds.); Macrodiscus Bureau; Neves-armondia K.Schum. in H.G.A.Engler & K.A.E.Prantl; Phaedranthus Miers; Pithecoctenium Mart. ex DC. in C.F.W.Meissner; Urbanolophium Melch.; Wunschmannia Urb.

= Amphilophium =

Genus of flowering plants

Amphilophium is a genus of flowering plants in the family Bignoniaceae, native to South America. Amphilophium crucigerum (syn. Pithecoctenium crucigerum) has escaped from cultivation elsewhere, and has become an invasive weed in Australia.

== Taxonomy ==
The genus Amphilophium was erected by Kunth in 1818, the type species being Amphilophium paniculatum, transferred from Bignonia. Many other genera have since been synonymized with Amphilophium.

=== Species ===
The following species are recognised in the genus Amphilophium:

- Amphilophium arenarium (A.H.Gentry) L.G.Lohmann
- Amphilophium aschersonii Ule
- Amphilophium ayaricum J.R.Grande
- Amphilophium bauhinioides (Bureau ex Baill.) L.G.Lohmann
- Amphilophium blanchetii (DC.) Bureau & K.Schum.
- Amphilophium bracteatum (Cham.) L.G.Lohmann
- Amphilophium buccinatorium (DC.) L.G.Lohmann
- Amphilophium campinae (A.Samp.) L.G.Lohmann
- Amphilophium carolinae (Lindl.) L.G.Lohmann
- Amphilophium chocoense (A.H.Gentry) L.G.Lohmann
- Amphilophium cremersii (A.H.Gentry) L.G.Lohmann
- Amphilophium crucigerum (L.) L.G.Lohmann
- Amphilophium cuneifolium (DC.) L.G.Lohmann
- Amphilophium dasytrichum (Sandwith) L.G.Lohmann
- Amphilophium dolichoides (Cham.) L.G.Lohmann
- Amphilophium dusenianum (Kraenzl.) L.G.Lohmann
- Amphilophium ecuadorense A.H.Gentry
- Amphilophium elongatum (Vahl) L.G.Lohmann
- Amphilophium falcatum (Vell.) L.G.Lohmann
- Amphilophium frutescens (DC.) L.G.Lohmann
- Amphilophium glaziovii Bureau ex K.Schum.
- Amphilophium gnaphalanthum (A.Rich.) L.G.Lohmann
- Amphilophium granulosum (Klotzsch) L.G.Lohmann
- Amphilophium lactiflorum (Vahl) L.G.Lohmann
- Amphilophium laeve (Sandwith) L.G.Lohmann
- Amphilophium laxiflorum (DC.) L.G.Lohmann
- Amphilophium lohmanniae (A.Pool) L.G.Lohmann
- Amphilophium magnoliifolium (Kunth) L.G.Lohmann
- Amphilophium mansoanum (DC.) L.G.Lohmann
- Amphilophium monophyllum (Sandwith) L.G.Lohmann
- Amphilophium nunezii (A.H.Gentry) L.G.Lohmann
- Amphilophium obovatum (Sandwith) L.G.Lohmann
- Amphilophium occidentale (A.H.Gentry) L.G.Lohmann
- Amphilophium paniculatum (L.) Kunth
- Amphilophium pannosum (DC.) Bureau & K.Schum.
- Amphilophium parkeri (DC.) L.G.Lohmann
- Amphilophium pauciflorum (A.H.Gentry) L.G.Lohmann
- Amphilophium perbracteatum A.H.Gentry
- Amphilophium pilosum Standl.
- Amphilophium porphyrotrichum (Sandwith) L.G.Lohmann
- Amphilophium pulverulentum (Sandwith) L.G.Lohmann
- Amphilophium racemosum (Bureau & K.Schum.) L.G.Lohmann
- Amphilophium reticulatum (A.H.Gentry) L.G.Lohmann
- Amphilophium rodriguesii (A.H.Gentry) L.G.Lohmann
- Amphilophium sandwithii Fabris
- Amphilophium scabriusculum (Mart. ex DC.) L.G.Lohmann
- Amphilophium stamineum (Lam.) L.G.Lohmann
- Amphilophium steyermarkii (A.H.Gentry) L.G.Lohmann
- Amphilophium vauthieri DC.
