= Oleuropein =

Names
- IUPAC name Methyl (2S,3E,4S)-4-{2-[2-(3,4-Dihydroxyphenyl)ethoxy]-2-oxoethyl}-3-ethylidene-2-(β-D-glucopyranosyloxy)-2H-pyran-5-carboxylate
- Systematic IUPAC name Methyl (2S,3E,4S)-4-{2-[2-(3,4-Dihydroxyphenyl)ethoxy]-2-oxoethyl}-3-ethylidene-2-{[(2S,3R,4S,5S,6R)-3,4,5-trihydroxy-6-(hydroxymethyl)oxan-2-yl]oxy}-2H-pyran-5-carboxylate
- Other names 2-(3,4-Dihydroxyphenyl)ethyl [(2S,3E,4S)-3-ethylidene-2-(β-D-glucopyranosyloxy)-5-(methoxycarbonyl)-3,4-dihydro-2H-pyran-4-yl]acetate

Identifiers
CAS Number	32619-42-4
3D model (JSmol)	Interactive image
ChEMBL	ChEMBL1911053
ChemSpider	4444876
ECHA InfoCard	100.046.466
PubChem CID	5281544
UNII	2O4553545L
CompTox Dashboard (EPA)	DTXSID60905103
- InChI: InChI=1S/C25H32O13/c1-3-13-14(9-19(29)35-7-6-12-4-5-16(27)17(28)8-12)15(23(33)34-2)11-36-24(13)38-25-22(32)21(31)20(30)18(10-26)37-25/h3-5,8,11,14,18,20-22,24-28,30-32H,6-7,9-10H2,1-2H3/b13-3+/t14-,18+,20+,21-,22+,24-,25-/m0/s1 Key: RFWGABANNQMHMZ-ZCHJGGQASA-N; InChI=1/C25H32O13/c1-3-13-14(9-19(29)35-7-6-12-4-5-16(27)17(28)8-12)15(23(33)34-2)11-36-24(13)38-25-22(32)21(31)20(30)18(10-26)37-25/h3-5,8,11,14,18,20-22,24-28,30-32H,6-7,9-10H2,1-2H3/b13-3+/t14-,18+,20+,21-,22+,24-,25-/m0/s1 Key: RFWGABANNQMHMZ-ZCHJGGQABE
- SMILES: O=C(OCCc1ccc(O)c(O)c1)C[C@H]2C(=C/C)\[C@@H](O\C=C2\C(=O)OC)O[C@@H]3O[C@@H]([C@@H](O)[C@H](O)[C@H]3O)CO

Properties
Chemical formula	C_{25}H_{32}O_{13}
Molar mass	540.518 g·mol^{−1}
- Except where otherwise noted, data are given for materials in their standard state (at 25 °C [77 °F], 100 kPa). verify (what is ?) Infobox references

Oleuropein is a glycosylated seco-iridoid, a bitter phenolic compound found in green olive skin, flesh, seeds, and leaves. The term oleuropein is derived from the botanical name of the species that includes the cultivated olive tree, Olea europaea.

Because of its bitter taste and astringency, oleuropein must be partially removed or decomposed to make olives edible. During processing of bitter and inedible green olives for consumption as table olives, oleuropein is removed from olives via a number of methods, including by immersion in lye.

== Chemical treatment ==
Oleuropein is a derivative of elenolic acid linked to the orthodiphenol hydroxytyrosol by an ester bond and to a molecule of glucose by a glycosidic bond. When olives are immersed in a lye solution, the alkaline conditions lead to hydrolysis of the ester bond. The basic conditions also significantly increase the solubility of these derivatives, facilitating their release into the lye solution.

The high pH accelerates the oxidation of the phenolics, leading to blackness, as during their normal ripening, if the solution is oxygenated by air injection (alkaline oxidation of olives is also called the California process).

The lye solution is replaced several times until the bitter taste has dissipated. An alternative process uses amberlite macroporous resins to trap the oleuropein directly from the solution, reducing waste water while capturing the extracted molecules.

Enzymatic hydrolysis during the maturation of olives is also an important process for the decomposition of oleuropein and elimination of its bitter taste.

== Green olive blackening ==
Green olives may be treated industrially with ferrous gluconate (0.4 wt. %) to change their color to black. Gluconate, an edible oxidation product of glucose, is used as non-toxic reactant to maintain Fe^{2+} in solution. When in contact with polyphenols, the ferrous ions form a black complex, giving the final color of the treated olives. Black olives treated with iron(II) gluconate are also depleted in hydroxytyrosol, as iron salts are catalysts for its oxidation.

== Research ==
Oleuropein has been proposed as a proteasome activator.

== See also ==
- Elenolic acid (a marker for maturation of olives)
- Hydroxytyrosol
- Ligstroside, a closely related compound also found in olives
- Oleocanthal
- Olive leaf
- Olive: Traditional fermentation and curing
