= Tyrosol =

Names
- Preferred IUPAC name 4-(2-Hydroxyethyl)phenol
- Other names p-Hydroxyphenethyl alcohol 2-(4-Hydroxyphenyl)ethanol; 4-Hydroxyphenylethanol

Identifiers
CAS Number	501-94-0
3D model (JSmol)	Interactive image
ChEBI	CHEBI:1879
ChEMBL	ChEMBL53566
ChemSpider	9964
ECHA InfoCard	100.007.210
PubChem CID	10393
UNII	1AK4MU3SNX
CompTox Dashboard (EPA)	DTXSID8060111
- InChI: InChI=1S/C8H10O2/c9-6-5-7-1-3-8(10)4-2-7/h1-4,9-10H,5-6H2 Key: YCCILVSKPBXVIP-UHFFFAOYSA-N; InChI=1S/C8H10O2/c9-6-5-7-1-3-8(10)4-2-7/h1-4,9-10H,5-6H2; InChI=1S/C8H10O2/c9-6-5-7-1-3-8(10)4-2-7/h1-4,9-10H,5-6H2 Key: YCCILVSKPBXVIP-UHFFFAOYSA-N
- SMILES: Oc1ccc(cc1)CCO

Properties
Chemical formula	C_{8}H_{10}O_{2}
Molar mass	138.164 g/mol
Melting point	91 to 92 °C (196 to 198 °F; 364 to 365 K)
Boiling point	158 °C (316 °F; 431 K) at 4 Torr
- Except where otherwise noted, data are given for materials in their standard state (at 25 °C [77 °F], 100 kPa). verify (what is ?) Infobox references

Tyrosol is an organic compound with the formula HOC_{6}H_{4}CH_{2}CH_{2}OH. Classified as a phenylethanoid, a derivative of phenethyl alcohol, it is found in a variety of natural sources. The compound is colorless solid. The principal source in the human diet is olive oil.

== Research ==
As an antioxidant, tyrosol may protect cells against injury due to oxidation in vitro. Although it is not as potent as other antioxidants present in olive oil (e.g., hydroxytyrosol), its higher concentration and good bioavailability indicate that it may have an important overall effect.

Tyrosol may also be cardioprotective. Tyrosol-treated animals showed significant increase in the phosphorylation of Akt, eNOS, and FOXO3a. In addition, tyrosol also induced the expression of the protein SIRT1 in the heart after myocardial infarction (MI) in a rat MI model.

Tyrosol forms esters with a variety of organic acids. For example, oleocanthal is the elenolic acid ester of tyrosol.

== See also ==
- Tyrosinol, HOC_{6}H_{4}CH_{2}CH(NH_{2})CH_{2}OH
- Hydroxytyrosol, (HO)_{2}C_{6}H_{3}CH_{2}CH_{2}OH
- Salidroside, a glucoside of tyrosol
