= Olive oil acidity =

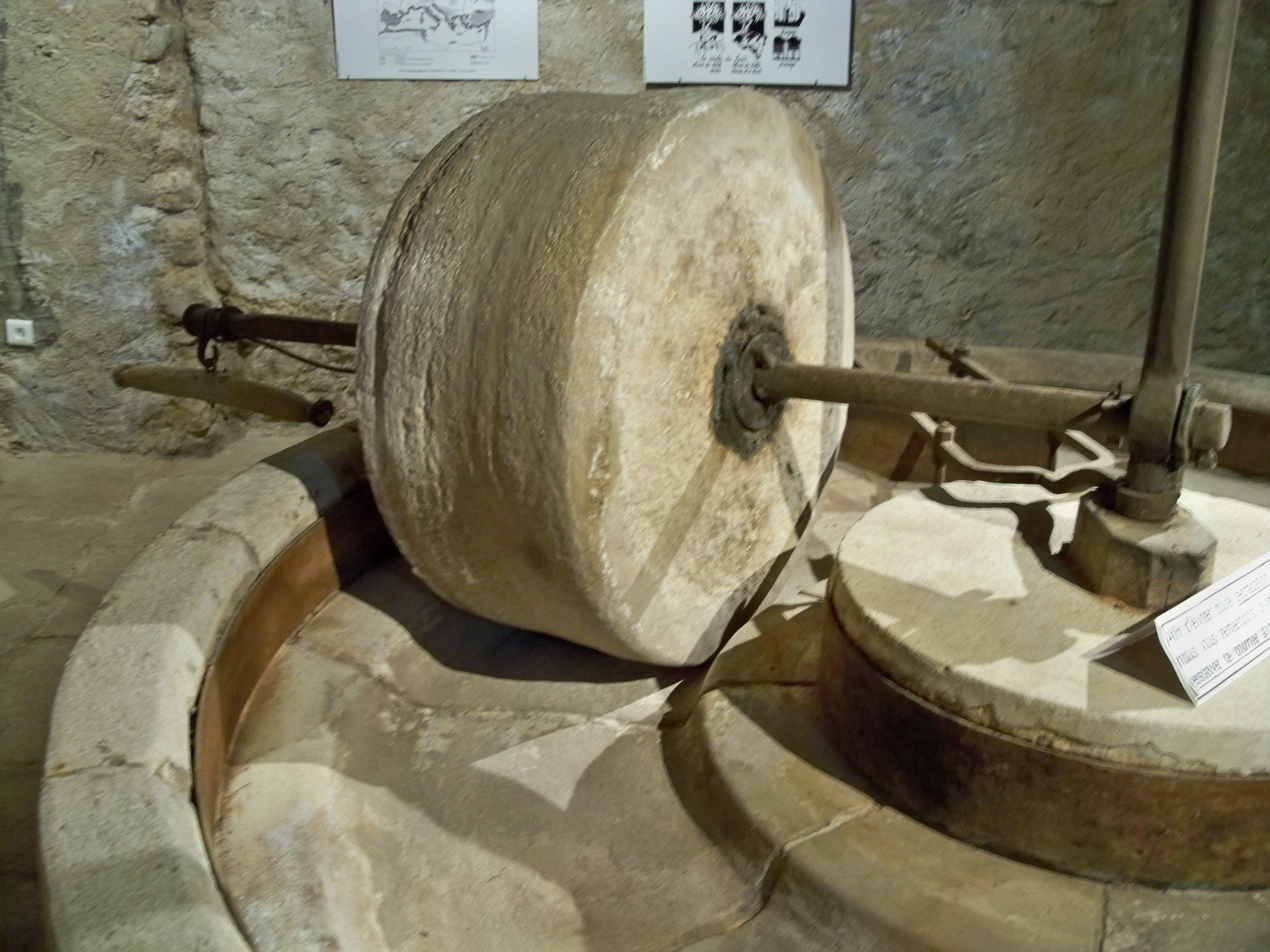
Separation of oil and water during processing reduces the formation of acids

Olive oil contains small amounts of free fatty acids (meaning not attached to other fatty acids in the form of a triglyceride). Free acidity is an important parameter that defines the quality of olive oil. It is usually expressed as a percentage of oleic acid (the main fatty acid present in olive oil) in the oil. As defined by the European Commission regulation No. 2022/2104, the highest quality olive oil (extra-virgin olive oil) must feature a free acidity lower than 0.8%. Virgin olive oil is characterized by acidity between 0.8% and 2%, while lampante olive oil (a low quality oil that is not edible) features a free acidity higher than 2%. The increase of free acidity in olive oil is due to free fatty acids that are released from triglycerides.

== Free fatty acids formation ==
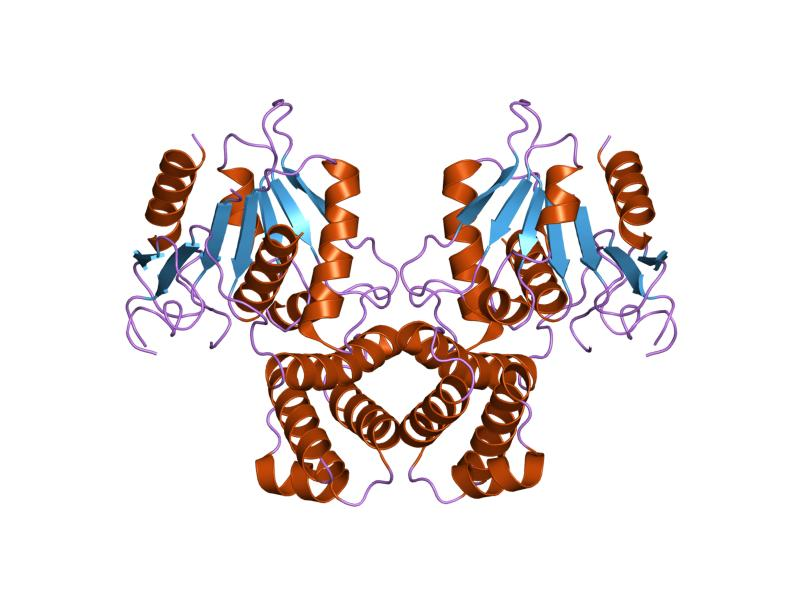
Diagram of fatty acid synthase

The presence of free fatty acids in olive oil is caused by a reaction (lipolysis) started when lipolytic enzymes (that are normally present in the pulp and seed cells of the olive) come in contact with the oil (that is contained in particular vacuoles) due to loss of integrity of the olive. High values of free acidity in olive oil can be due to different factors such as: production from unhealthy olives (due to microorganisms and moulds contamination or attacked by flies and parasites), bruised olives, delayed harvesting and storage before processing. The lipolysis reaction is greatly enhanced by the presence of an aqueous phase, so when oil is separated from water during processing, lipolysis slows down and stops.

== Measurement of free acidity ==
Free acidity is a defect of olive oil that is tasteless and odorless, thus can not be detected by sensory analysis. Since vegetable oils are not aqueous fluids, a pH-meter can not be used for this measure. Various approaches exist that can measure oil acidity with good accuracy.

=== Manual titration ===
The official technique to measure free acidity in olive oil (as defined by the European Commission regulation No. 2568/91) is a manual titration procedure: a known volume of the oil to be tested is added to a mix of ether, methanol and phenolphthalein. Known volumes of 0.1 M potassium hydroxide (KOH) (the titrant) are added until there is a change in the color of the solution. The total volume of added titrant is then used to estimate the free acidity. The official technique for acidity measure in olive oil is accurate and reliable, but is essentially a laboratory method that must be carried out by trained personnel (mainly because of the toxic compounds used). Hence it is not suitable for in situ measurements in small oil mills.

=== Near-infrared spectroscopy ===
One of the most promising methods is based on optical near-infrared spectroscopy (NIR) where the optical absorbance, i.e. the fraction of intensity of the incident light that is absorbed by the oil sample, is used to estimate the oil acidity. An oil sample is placed in a cuvette and analyzed by a spectrophotometer on a wide range of wavelengths. The results (i.e. the absorbance data for every tested wavelength) are thus processed by a statistical algorithm, such as Principal Component Analysis (PCA) or Partial Least Squares regression (PLS), to estimate the oil acidity. The feasibility to measure olive oil free acidity and peroxide value by NIR spectroscopy in the wavenumber range 4,541 to 11,726 cm^{−1} was reported. Many commercial spectrophotometers exist that can be used for analysis of different quality parameters in olive oil. The main advantage of NIR spectroscopy is the possibility to carry out the analysis on raw olive oil samples, without any chemical pretreatment. The main drawbacks are the high cost of commercial spectrophotometer and the need of calibration for different types of oil (produced by olives of different varieties, different geographical origin, etc.).

=== Electrochemical impedance spectroscopy ===
Another approach is based on electrochemical impedance spectroscopy (EIS). EIS is a powerful technique that has been widely used to characterize different food products such as the analysis of milk composition, the characterization and the determination of the freezing end-point of ice-cream mixes, the measure of meat ageing, and the investigation of ripeness and quality in fruits.
