= Echinacoside =

- Chemical structure of echinacoside

Names
- IUPAC name 2-(3,4-Dihydroxyphenyl)ethyl α-L-rhamnopyranosyl-(1→3)-[β-D-glucopyranosyl-(1→6)]-β-D-glucopyranoside 4-[(2E)-3-(3,4-dihydroxyphenyl)prop-2-enoate]
- Systematic IUPAC name (2R,3R,4R,5R,6R)-5-Hydroxy-2-({[(2R,3R,4S,5S,6R)-3,4,5-trihydroxy-6-(hydroxymethyl)oxan-2-yl]oxy}methyl)-4-{[(2S,3R,4R,5R,6S)-3,4,5-trihydroxy-6-methyloxan-2-yl]oxy}-6-[2-(3,4-dihydroxyphenyl)ethoxy]oxan-3-yl (2E)-3-(3,4-dihydroxyphenyl)prop-2-enoate

Identifiers
CAS Number	82854-37-3
3D model (JSmol)	Interactive image
ChemSpider	4445084
ECHA InfoCard	100.127.421
PubChem CID	5281771
UNII	I04O1DT48T
CompTox Dashboard (EPA)	DTXSID0033469
- InChI: InChI=1S/C35H46O20/c1-14-24(42)26(44)29(47)35(51-14)55-32-30(48)34(49-9-8-16-3-6-18(38)20(40)11-16)53-22(13-50-33-28(46)27(45)25(43)21(12-36)52-33)31(32)54-23(41)7-4-15-2-5-17(37)19(39)10-15/h2-7,10-11,14,21-22,24-40,42-48H,8-9,12-13H2,1H3/b7-4+/t14-,21+,22+,24-,25+,26+,27-,28+,29+,30+,31+,32+,33+,34+,35-/m0/s1 Key: FSBUXLDOLNLABB-ISAKITKMSA-N; InChI=1/C35H46O20/c1-14-24(42)26(44)29(47)35(51-14)55-32-30(48)34(49-9-8-16-3-6-18(38)20(40)11-16)53-22(13-50-33-28(46)27(45)25(43)21(12-36)52-33)31(32)54-23(41)7-4-15-2-5-17(37)19(39)10-15/h2-7,10-11,14,21-22,24-40,42-48H,8-9,12-13H2,1H3/b7-4+/t14-,21+,22+,24-,25+,26+,27-,28+,29+,30+,31+,32+,33+,34+,35-/m0/s1 Key: FSBUXLDOLNLABB-ISAKITKMBV
- SMILES: C[C@H]1[C@@H]([C@H]([C@H]([C@@H](O1)O[C@@H]2[C@H]([C@@H](O[C@@H]([C@H]2OC(=O)/C=C/c3ccc(c(c3)O)O)CO[C@H]4[C@@H]([C@H]([C@@H]([C@H](O4)CO)O)O)O)OCCc5ccc(c(c5)O)O)O)O)O)O

Properties
Chemical formula	C_{35}H_{46}O_{20}
Molar mass	786,73 g/mol
Melting point	200 to 220 °C (392 to 428 °F; 473 to 493 K)
- Except where otherwise noted, data are given for materials in their standard state (at 25 °C [77 °F], 100 kPa). verify (what is ?) Infobox references

Echinacoside is a natural phenol. It is a caffeic acid glycoside from the phenylpropanoid class. It is constituted from a trisaccharide consisting of two glucose and one rhamnose moieties glycosidically linked to one caffeic acid and one dihydroxyphenylethanol (hydroxytyrosol) residue at the centrally situated rhamnose. This water-soluble glycoside is a distinctive secondary metabolite of Echinacea angustifolia and Echinacea pallida (to about 1%) but only occurs in trace amounts in Echinacea purpurea. It is also isolated from Cistanche spp.

It was first isolated by Stoll et al. in 1950 from the roots of Echinacea angustifolia. It shows weak antibiotic activity in vitro against Staphylococcus aureus and Streptococci.
