= Ligstroside =

Polyphenol compound

Names
- IUPAC name Methyl (4S,5E,6S)-5-ethylidene-4-[2-[2-(4-hydroxyphenyl)ethoxy]-2-oxoethyl]-6-[(2S,3R,4S,5S,6R)-3,4,5-trihydroxy-6-(hydroxymethyl)oxan-2-yl]oxy-4H-pyran-3-carboxylate

Identifiers
| CAS Number | 35897-92-8 |
| 3D model (JSmol) | Interactive image |
| ChEBI | CHEBI:149585 |
| ChEMBL | ChEMBL1086877 |
| ChemSpider | 22912948 |
| PubChem CID | 14136859 |
| UNII | 83S9SA69C5 |
| CompTox Dashboard (EPA) | DTXSID701318124 |
- InChI: InChI=1S/C25H32O12/c1-3-15-16(10-19(28)34-9-8-13-4-6-14(27)7-5-13)17(23(32)33-2)12-35-24(15)37-25-22(31)21(30)20(29)18(11-26)36-25/h3-7,12,16,18,20-22,24-27,29-31H,8-11H2,1-2H3/b15-3+/t16-,18+,20+,21-,22+,24-,25-/m0/s1 Key: GMQXOLRKJQWPNB-MVVLSVRYSA-N
- SMILES: C/C=C/1\[C@@H](C(=CO[C@H]1O[C@H]2[C@@H]([C@H]([C@@H]([C@H](O2)CO)O)O)O)C(=O)OC)CC(=O)OCCC3=CC=C(C=C3)O

Properties
| Chemical formula | C_{25}H_{32}O_{12} |
| Molar mass | 524.519 g·mol^{−1} |
- Except where otherwise noted, data are given for materials in their standard state (at 25 °C [77 °F], 100 kPa). Infobox references

Ligstroside is an important phenolic compound present in olive cultivars. It has a role as a plant metabolite and an antineoplastic agent. Differs from oleuropein by one hydroxyl group.
