= Hydroxytyrosol =

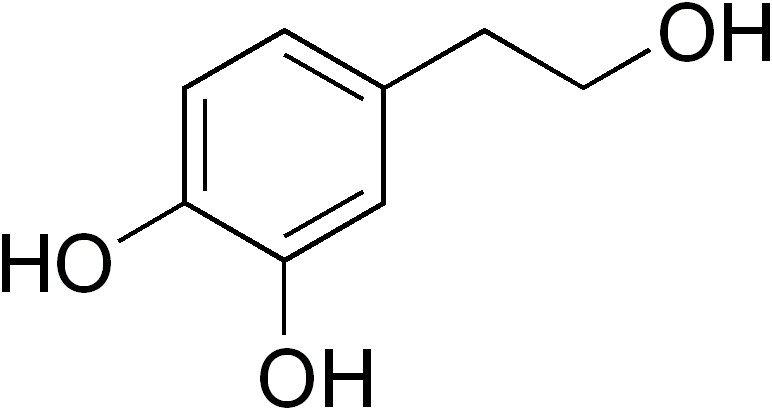
- Hydroxytyrosol

Names
- Preferred IUPAC name 4-(2-Hydroxyethyl)benzene-1,2-diol
- Other names 3-Hydroxytyrosol; 3,4-dihydroxyphenylethanol (DOPET); Dihydroxyphenylethanol; 2-(3,4-Di-hydroxyphenyl)-ethanol (DHPE); 3,4-dihydroxyphenolethanol (3,4-DHPEA)

Identifiers
CAS Number	10597-60-1
3D model (JSmol)	Interactive image
ChEBI	CHEBI:68889
ChEMBL	ChEMBL485747
ChemSpider	74680
DrugBank	DB12771
ECHA InfoCard	100.114.418
EC Number	600-704-3
PubChem CID	82755
UNII	QEU0NE4O90
CompTox Dashboard (EPA)	DTXSID70147451
- InChI: InChI=1S/C8H10O3/c9-4-3-6-1-2-7(10)8(11)5-6/h1-2,5,9-11H,3-4H2 Key: JUUBCHWRXWPFFH-UHFFFAOYSA-N; InChI=1/C8H10O3/c9-4-3-6-1-2-7(10)8(11)5-6/h1-2,5,9-11H,3-4H2 Key: JUUBCHWRXWPFFH-UHFFFAOYAM
- SMILES: Oc1ccc(cc1O)CCO

Properties
Chemical formula	C_{8}H_{10}O_{3}
Molar mass	154.165 g·mol^{−1}
Appearance	colorless solid
Solubility in water	5 g/100 ml

Hazards
- Occupational safety and health (OHS/OSH)
Main hazards	Causes skin irritation. Causes serious eye irritation. May cause respiratory irritation.
- GHS labelling
Pictograms	(GHS07: Exclamation mark)
Signal word	Warning
Hazard statements	H315, H319, H335
Precautionary statements	P261, P264, P271, P280, P302+P352, P304+P340, P305+P351+P338, P312, P321, P332+P313, P337+P313, P362, P403+P233, P405, P501
- Safety data sheet (SDS)

Related compounds
Related alcohols	benzyl alcohol, tyrosol
- Except where otherwise noted, data are given for materials in their standard state (at 25 °C [77 °F], 100 kPa). verify (what is ?) Infobox references

Hydroxytyrosol is an organic compound with the formula (HO)_{2}C_{6}H_{3}CH_{2}CH_{2}OH. It is a phenylethanoid, i.e. a relative of phenethyl alcohol. Its derivatives are found in a variety of natural sources, notably olive oils and wines. Hydroxytyrosol is a colorless solid, although samples often turn beige during storage. It is a derivative, formally speaking, of catechol.

Hydroxytyrosol and its derivatives occur in olives and in wines.

== Occurrence ==
=== Olives ===
Oleuropein, bitter compound, an ester of hydroxytyrosol found in green olive skin

The olives, leaves, and olive pulp contain large amounts of hydroxytyrosol derivative oleuropein, more so than olive oil. Unprocessed, green (unripe) olives contain between 4.3 and 116 mg of hydroxytyrosol per 100 g of olives, while unprocessed, black (ripe) olives contain up to 413.3 mg per 100 g. The ripening of an olive substantially increases the amount of hydroxytyrosol. Processed olives, such as the common canned variety containing iron(II) gluconate, contain little hydroxytyrosol, as iron salts are catalysts for its oxidation.

=== Food safety ===
Hydroxytyrosol is considered safe as a novel food for human consumption, with a no-observed-adverse-effect level of 50 mg/kg body weight per day, as evaluated by the European Food Safety Authority (EFSA).

In the United States, hydroxytyrosol is considered to be a safe ingredient (GRAS) in processed foods at levels of 5 mg per serving.

=== Function and production ===
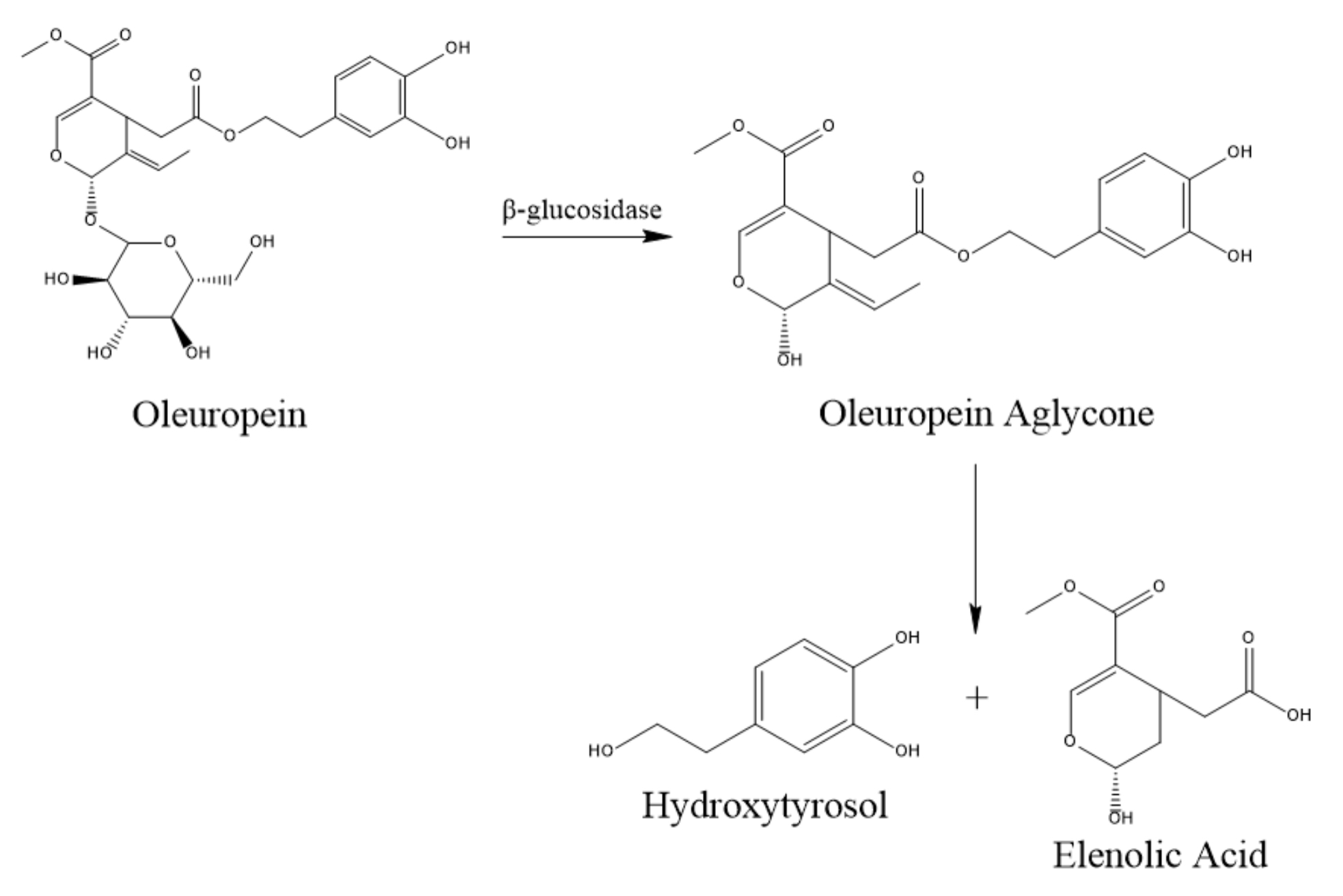
Hydroxytyrosol is produced by the breakdown of oleuropein

In nature, hydroxytyrosol is generated by the hydrolysis of oleuropein that occurs during olive ripening. Oleuropein accumulates in olive leaves and fruit as a defense mechanism against pathogens and herbivores. During olive ripening or when the olive tissue is damaged by pathogens, herbivores, or mechanical damage, the enzyme β-glucosidase catalyzes hydroxytyrosol synthesis via hydrolysis from oleuropein.

=== Metabolism ===
Shortly after olive oil consumption, 98% of hydroxytyrosol in plasma and urine appears in conjugated forms (65% glucuronoconjugates), suggesting extensive first-pass metabolism and a half-life of 2.43 hours.

== Mediterranean diet ==
Mediterranean diets, characterized by regular intake of olive oil, have been shown to positively affect human health, including reduced rates of cardiovascular diseases. Research on consumption of olive oil and its components includes hydroxytyrosol and oleuropein, which may inhibit oxidation of LDL cholesterol – a risk factor for atherosclerosis, heart attack or stroke. The daily intake of hydroxytyrosol within the Mediterranean diet is estimated to be between 0.15 and 30 mg.

== Regulation ==
=== Europe ===
The EFSA has issued a scientific opinion on health claims in relation to dietary consumption of hydroxytyrosol and related polyphenol compounds from olive fruit and oil, and protection of blood lipids from potential oxidative damage.

EFSA concluded that a cause-and-effect relationship existed between the consumption of hydroxytyrosol and related compounds from olives and olive oil and protection of blood lipids from oxidative damage, providing a health claim for consumption of olive oil polyphenols containing at least 5 mg of hydroxytyrosol and its derivatives (oleuropein complex and tyrosol) per 20 g of olive oil.

== See also ==
- Echinacoside, a hydroxytyrosol-containing glycoside
- Tyrosol
- Verbascoside, another hydroxytyrosol-containing glycoside
- Resveratrol
