= Salov =

Salov or SALOV may refer to:

- Šalov, a village in Levice District in Slovakia
- Salov (surname)
- Società per Azioni Lucchese Olii e Vini (SALOV), the owners of the Filippo Berio brand of olive oil
