= Olive oil raids of 2023 in Europe =

Seizure of counterfeit olive oil in Europe

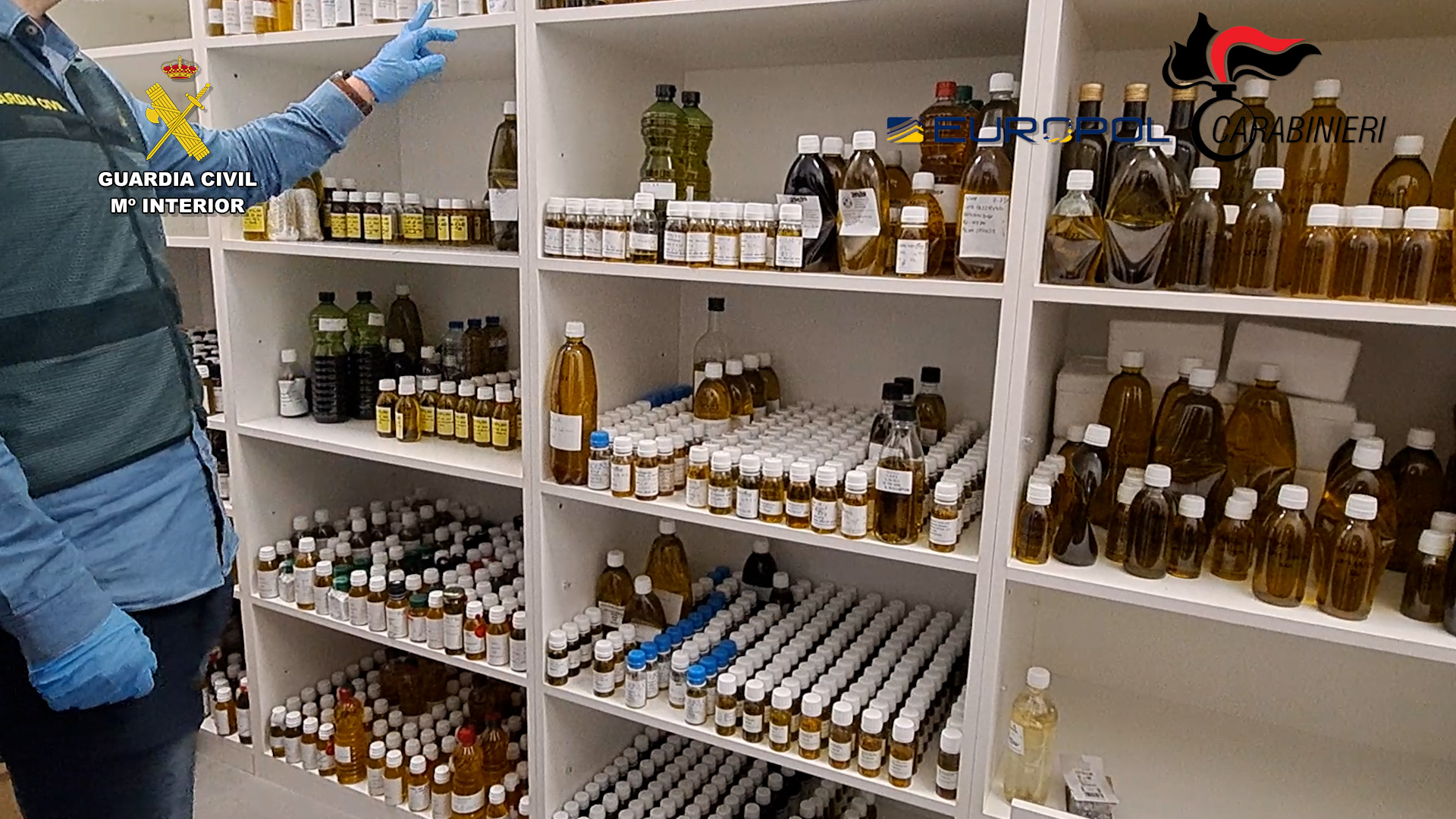
Civil Guard of Spain investigating a counterfeit olive oil lab

The Olive oil raids of 2023 in Europe refers to a coordinated law enforcement effort named Operation OPSON by Spanish, Italian police and Europol to combat a significant food fraud operation involving the production and sale of counterfeit extra virgin olive oil. This operation, uncovered by officials, involved the production of over 260,000 liters of olive oil falsely labeled as high-quality and extra virgin but deemed "unfit for consumption" by the experts.

The fat in the product was of such poor quality that the operation has been named Omegabad (bad omega, in reference to the beneficial fat in the oil).

== Discovery ==
Initially it all started with an inspection of an oil tanker transporting oil in Manzanares, Spain, where several anomalies were found. Subsequent investigations led to the discovery of a company with two subsidiaries dedicated to the international distribution of adulterated olive oil, one Spanish and the other Italian. In Ciudad Real, Castilla-La Mancha, a company linked to the process of obtaining lampante oils was allegedly used to make changes to the oils produced and falsify documents to market them as "virgin" and "extra virgin".

== Raids ==
In November and December 2023, law enforcement agencies Guardia Civil Interior from Spain and Carabinieri of Italy and Europol of the EU, conducted raids at multiple operation facilities across both countries, dedicated to the international distribution of the adulterated olive oil. These raids led to the arrest of 11 individuals involved in the scheme and seizure of various items. Individuals were suspected of mixing high-quality oil with low-quality "lampante" oil, which historically was used as fuel for oil lamps, characterized by its inferior quality due to high acidity levels and unpleasant taste and odor, rendering it unsuitable for consumption according to European Union standards.

In Ciudad Real, Jaén and Córdoba, in Spain, 16 oil barrels containing 260,000 liters of adulterated oil and more than 5,200 liters of adulterated olive oil prepared for sale were seized and more than € 91,000 in cash were seized. In Sicily and Tuscany, authorities suspected the involvement of three oil factories in the scheme. In all cases, Europol did not name the companies involved.

== Methods ==
In Spain, criminals used a company linked to the process of acquiring lower category oils from Portugal to make changes in the category from cloudy to lampante oils in order to convert them into virgin and extra virgin by falsifying the documentation to be able to market them. They mixed the cloudy oils, a by-product of olive oil, with the best quality olive oil to achieve adequate fat and erythrodiol parameters to allow trade. They also prevented the traceability of the product by not registering their company's olive oils.

== See also ==
- Olive oil regulation and adulteration
- European Union food quality scandal
