= Olive oil regulation and adulteration =

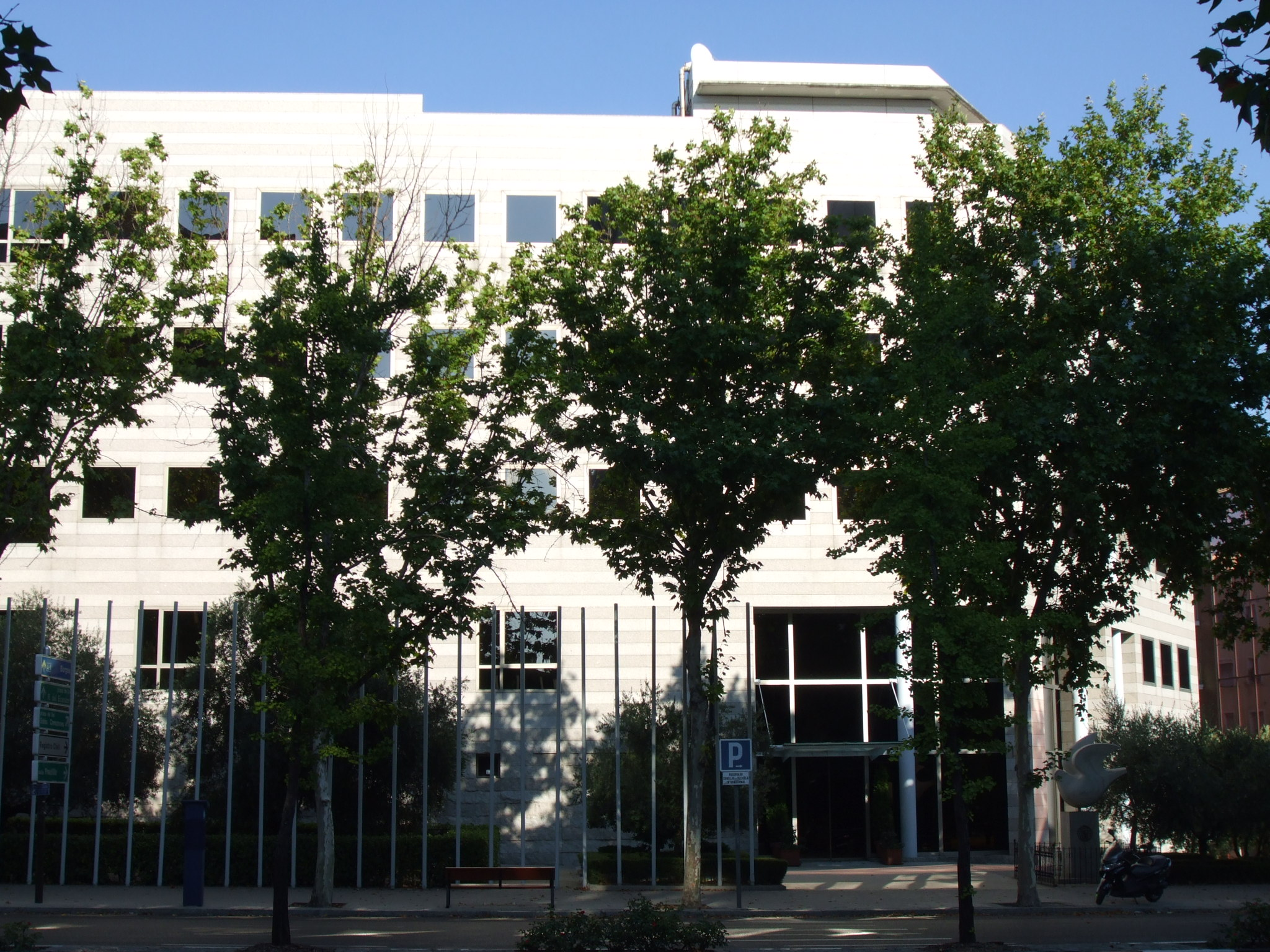
International Olive Council building

Olive oil regulation and adulteration are complex issues overseen and studied by various governmental bodies, non-governmental organizations, and private researchers across the world. The most frequent type of adulteration is that oil of lower quality is mixed into olive oil.

== Background of regulation ==
The EU regulates the use of different protected designation of origin labels for olive oils.

The International Olive Council (IOC) is an intergovernmental organization with 16 member states plus the European Union based in Madrid, Spain. It promotes olive oil around the world by tracking production, defining quality standards, and monitoring authenticity. More than 98 percent of the world's olives are grown in IOC member nations.

The IOC officially governs 95 per cent of international production and holds great influence over the rest. IOC terminology is precise, but it can lead to confusion between the words that describe production and the words used on retail labels. Olive oil is classified by how it was produced, by its chemistry, and by its flavor. All production begins by transforming the olive fruit into olive paste. This paste is then malaxed to allow the microscopic oil droplets to concentrate. The oil is extracted by means of pressure (traditional method) or centrifugation (modern method). After extraction the remnant solid substance, called pomace, still contains a small quantity of oil.

=== United States ===
The United States is not a member of the IOC, and the US Department of Agriculture does not legally recognize its classifications, such as extra-virgin olive oil. In October 2011, the United States adopted new olive oil standards, revising those that had been in place since 1948, which affected importers and domestic growers and producers by ensuring conformity with the benchmarks commonly accepted in the U.S. and abroad.

As of 1998, US Customs regulations on "country of origin" have stated that if a non-origin nation is shown on the label, then the real origin must be shown on the same side of the label and in comparable size letters so as not to mislead the consumer. Yet most major US brands continue to put "imported from Italy" on the front label in large letters and other origins on the back in very small print. These products are a mixture of olive oil from more than one nation and it is not clear what percentage of the olive oil is really of Italian origin. This practice makes it difficult for high quality, lower cost producers outside of Italy to enter the US market, and for genuine Italian producers to compete.

In the United States, the Food & Drug Administration (FDA) does not routinely test imported olive oil for adulteration.

== Testing for purity ==
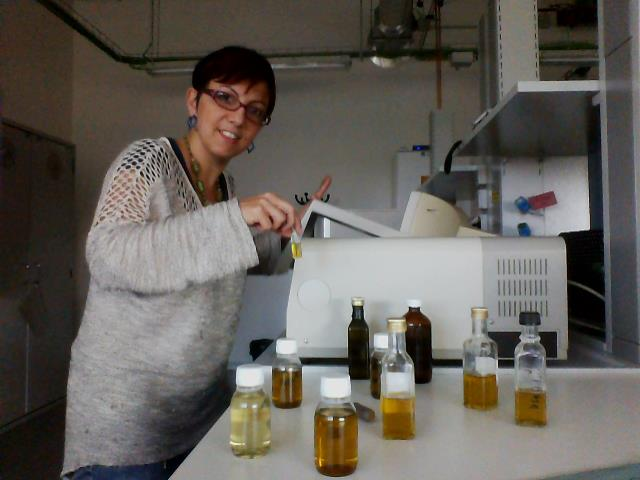
UV-Vis spectroscopy analysis of olive oil samples in an Italian laboratory

The detection of olive oil adulteration is often complicated with no single test that can accomplish the task. A battery of tests is employed to determine olive oil authenticity and identity of the adulterant. Included in this testing regime is the determination of free acidity, peroxide value, Ultraviolet light extinction, fatty acid composition, sterol composition, triglyceride composition, wax content, steroidal hydrocarbons, and the Bellier test. Methods employing chromatography/mass spectrometry and spectroscopy are also used to detect adulteration of olive oil.

Test results are measured against the International Olive Council trade standard to identify abnormalities. Each test provides key information which allows a decision to be made with respect to the grade of olive oil and the identity of any adulterants. However, the International Olive Council does not test for deodorisation which makes up the bulk of fake extra-virgin oils. Soft column deodorisation is the process where steam is forced through a tank of inferior oil which removes all taste, colour and nutrients; colouring is then added before the tank is topped up with real extra-virgin oil to add flavour.

A test published in 1887 described the detection of olive oil adulterated with mineral oil by a simple titration of the carboxylic acid moieties present in natural vegetable oils. The procedure involved boiling 10 milliliters of olive oil with 40 milliliters of approximately 1 molar potassium hydroxide in 95% ethanol, adding water to 100 grams to dissolve the saponified lipids, and titrating against a normal sulfuric acid solution using phenolphthalein as a pH indicator dye. The base stock solution was titrated to neutralize an equal quantity of the acid, so without the presence of vegetable oil it would require 40 milliliters of acid to cause a color change, but in the pure oils tested (almond, benne, cottonseed, cod liver oil, linseed oil, and olive oil), only 6 milliliters were required. In accordance with this, olive oil adulterated with 10% mineral oil required 8 milliliters, and with 20% 11 milliliters. The adulterated oil tested in 1887 required 14 to 17 milliliters to neutralize, so it might have been 30–40% mineral oil.

DNA analysis methods, based on the use of polymerase chain reaction (PCR) (e.g. DNA fingerprinting), have also been used. These techniques require extensive sample preparation, which needs specific optimization to ensure extraction of sufficient DNA, and that PCR inhibitors are not affecting the analysis. To date, there is no DNA extraction method applicable to any sample.

In 2014, an "invisible oil tag" using artificial, sub-micrometer-sized DNA barcodes was suggested by researchers from ETH Zürich. The barcodes consist of magnetically recoverable silica particles containing synthetic DNA sequences, which are added to the oil in a very small amount (down to 1 ppb) and can be retrieved at any time for authenticity test by PCR/sequencing. The advantages of this method, compared to conventional techniques are its low-cost, minimal sample preparation and minute volumes, and its universalness, since it can be applied to any oil type/sample.

=== Industry certifications of quality ===
As of 2015, the North American Olive Oil Association (NAOOA) offered a Quality Seal Program to guarantee authenticity of olive oil. Members of the association agreed to have their oils tested twice a year to ensure the oil meets or exceeds the International Olive Council (IOC) standards. The testing includes both sensory (taste/smell) and chemical tests for purity. Samples are purchased from the retail marketplace to ensure that the products tested are the same as the ones purchased by consumers. The test samples are not selected and submitted by olive oil producers. Brands pay for the testing through a yearly licensing fee.

The California Olive Oil Council (COOC) tests samples of olive oil submitted by producers for extra virgin quality. The samples are provided by the producers. The testing is primarily sensory with some chemical tests.

The Extra Virgin Alliance, an initiative of the NAOOA, offers the EVA Mark of quality and authenticity. The EVA standard includes both sensory and chemical parameters for olive oils at their production, bottling, and Best Before Date, using stricter criteria than the IOC standard, as well as packaging and labeling transparency requirements.

=== Simple home tests ===
==== Refrigeration ====
There is a persistent mistaken belief that when genuine olive oil (or, in some versions, extra virgin olive oil specifically) is refrigerated, it will solidify or become much more viscous. This mistaken belief is based on the fact that olive oil is composed mainly of the monounsaturated fat oleic acid, and pure oleic acid (triolein) has a melting point of 5 ˚C, which is slightly above the high end of proper refrigerator temperature. Thus, if olive oil were pure triolein, it would solidify in a properly set refrigerator. However, olive oil is a complex mixture with significant variability in its fatty acid structure, and can be anywhere from 55% to 83% oleic acid, with the remainder a mixture of polyunsaturated fat and saturated fat, as well as containing waxes, phytosterols, and other compounds that affect its melting temperature. Thus, in practice, many olive oils have significantly lower melting temperatures. In fact, one might expect a refined seed oil with very high oleic acid content (such as high oleic sunflower oil) to be more likely to solidify in the refrigerator, based on their fatty acid composition and lack of minor compounds.

The "fridge test" for adulteration was evaluated by scientists at the Olive Center at the University of California, Davis. Researchers put seven samples of different oils into a refrigerator at 4.7 ˚C, including a premium extra-virgin olive oil; low-quality extra-virgin olive oil; a blend of virgin and refined olive oil; refined canola oil; refined safflower oil; a 50:50 mixture of the premium extra virgin olive oil with the blended olive oil; and a 50:50 mixture of the premium extra virgin olive oil with the refined safflower oil. Several days of refrigeration was required before congealing of any of the samples became apparent. Although none of the samples solidified fully, the three which contained either 100% extra virgin olive oil or a 50:50 mix of extra virgin and blended olive oil had partially solidified after a week, whereas the other samples remained clear. The authors conclude that refrigeration is not reliable in detecting olive oil adulteration. However, based on these results, the absence or any visible congealing after a week of refrigeration would not be an encouraging sign if the olive oil had been sold as pure extra virgin.

==== Ignition ====
Pure olive oil should burn in an oil lamp. The ignition test, however, like the refrigerator test, is not conclusive.

== Investigations, incidents, and recalls ==
As of 2021, the most frequent type of adulteration of olive oil is that oil of lower quality is mixed into it. Adulterated oil is usually no more serious than passing off inferior, but safe, products as superior olive oil, however in 1981 almost 700 people died, it is believed, as a consequence of consuming rapeseed (canola) oil adulterated with aniline intended for use as an industrial lubricant, but sold as olive oil in Spain (see toxic oil syndrome).

In 1993, the FDA ordered a recall of olive oils from Rubino U.S.A. Inc. of Cincinnati, Ohio, which were nothing more than canola oil.

In 1997, the Canadian Food Inspection Agency began conducting tests on 100 oils claimed to be 100% olive oil and in 1999 the CFIA concluded that 20 per cent of the oils were fake.

In 2007, NPR reported that with Italian extra-virgin olive oil in high demand with concomitant high prices, adulterated olive oil had become the biggest source of agricultural fraud problems in the European Union. Some oil labeled "extra-virgin" is diluted with cheaper olive oils or other vegetable oils. In some cases, lampante, or "lamp oil", which is made from spoiled olives fallen from trees, is used, even though it cannot legally be sold as food. One fraud ring was accused of colouring low-grade soy oil and canola oil with industrial chlorophyll, and flavoring it with beta-carotene.

In August 2007, The New Yorker stated that major Italian shippers routinely adulterate olive oil and that only about 40% of olive oil sold as "extra virgin" actually meets the specification. In some cases, colza oil with added color and flavor has been labeled and sold as olive oil. This extensive fraud prompted the Italian government to mandate a new labeling law in 2007 for companies selling olive oil, under which every bottle of Italian olive oil would have to declare the farm and press on which it was produced, as well as display a precise breakdown of the oils used, for blended oils. In February 2008, however, EU officials took issue with the new law, stating that under EU rules such labeling should be voluntary rather than compulsory. Under EU rules, olive oil may be sold as Italian even if it only contains a small amount of Italian oil.

In March 2008, 400 Italian police officers conducted "Operation Golden Oil", arresting 23 people and confiscating 85 farms after an investigation revealed a large-scale scheme to relabel oils from other Mediterranean nations as Italian. In April 2008, another operation impounded seven olive oil plants and arrested 40 people in nine provinces of northern and southern Italy for adding chlorophyll to sunflower and soybean oil and selling it as extra virgin olive oil, both in Italy and abroad. 25,000 liters of the fake oil were seized and prevented from being exported.

In December 2008, the Guardia Civil in La Rioja warned about the possible sale of adulterated olive oil in the area. This warning came after 550 litres of oil was found in a large container labelled "Astispumante 1510" ("Asti Sparkling Wine") in Rincón de Soto and after the theft of 1,750 litres of oil was reported in the area on 18 December 2008.

In the first week of March 2010, researchers at the University of California, Davis' Olive Center purchased three bottles each of 14 imported olive oils and five California oils at retail stores in three different regions of California (Sacramento County, San Francisco Bay Area and Los Angeles County). All of the oils were labeled "extra-virgin olive oil". Samples were shipped to the Australian Oils Research Laboratory in Wagga Wagga, and were analyzed by their laboratory (which is recognized by the IOC to provide chemical analysis of olive oil) and tested by their sensory panel (which is recognized by the IOC as qualified to perform olive oil sensory analysis). Duplicate testing was performed at the UC Davis olive oil research project laboratories. Sixty-nine percent of the imported olive oils and 10% of the California oils failed to meet the IOC/USDA taste standards for extra-virgin olive oil. Samples that failed had a median of up to 3.5 IOC-standardized sensory defects (such as rancid, fusty, and musty). The standard IOC/USDA chemical tests only identified 31% of the failed oils as defective, primarily by exceeding the IOC/USDA limit for ultraviolet absorbance of late oxidation products (K232 and K268); two more recently introduced German chemical tests (now incorporated into the Australian extra-virgin standard) were each more than twice as effective at detection of defective oils. A subsequent round of testing in 2011 found similar results. The UC Davis report was contested by the North American Olive Oil Association on the grounds that UC Davis has a conflict of interest due to the fact that they market their own olive oil and have an interest in promoting olive oil from California. The IOC stated that the study contained "[an] evident undercurrent of aggressive, inexplicable criticism of imported olive oil quality".

In March 2011, the prosecutor's office in Florence, Italy, working in conjunction with the forestry department, indicted two managers and an officer of Carapelli, one of the brands of the Spanish company Grupo SOS (which recently changed its name to Deoleo) and Pietro Coricelli. The charges involved falsified documents and food fraud. Carapelli lawyer Neri Pinucci said the company was not worried about the charges and that "the case is based on an irregularity in the documents". However, in June 2017 the Italian competition authority (Autorità Garante della Concorrenza e del Mercato) found them guilty of unfair business practices regarding their olive oil brands and imposed fines on them and the discount supermarket chain Lidl, amounting to nearly €1 million.

In 2012, The Advertiser of Adelaide wrote that while only less than 10% of world olive oil production met the criteria for labeling as extra-virgin, it had been estimated that up to 50% of retail oil is labeled "extra-virgin". Tests by the Australian Olive Association (AOA) in 2012 showed that every imported brand of extra-virgin olive oil fell below the standard that would be required for AOA certification. The AOA has been campaigning to have the Australian Competition & Consumer Commission force supermarkets to adhere to the code. Standards Australia has adopted a code of practice for the testing of olive oils; however, while allowing oils to be certified as being genuine extra-virgin, the code regarding labeling is voluntary.

In 2013, "Figures released at the [IOC's] Workshop on Olive Oil Authentication, held in Madrid June 10–11, showed that one in four olive oils sampled in Spain, and nearly one in three in Canada, failed recent official fraud tests."

In June 2017, the Olive Oil Times published, that according to independent testing, oil from the brands Bertolli, Carapelli, Coricelli, Primadonna, and Sasso labelled as "extra virgin" was in fact only "virgin".

In December 2023, it was reported that the Spanish Civil Guard and the Italian Carabinieri together with Europol had arrested 11 people who adulterated more than 260,000 liters, or roughly 68,000 gallons, of olive oil with lampante oil in November in Sicily, Tuscany and Ciudad Real in Spain.

== See also ==
- Extra Virginity: The Sublime and Scandalous World of Olive Oil Tom Mueller's book on olive oil
