= Gallinero de Rioja =

- Populated place
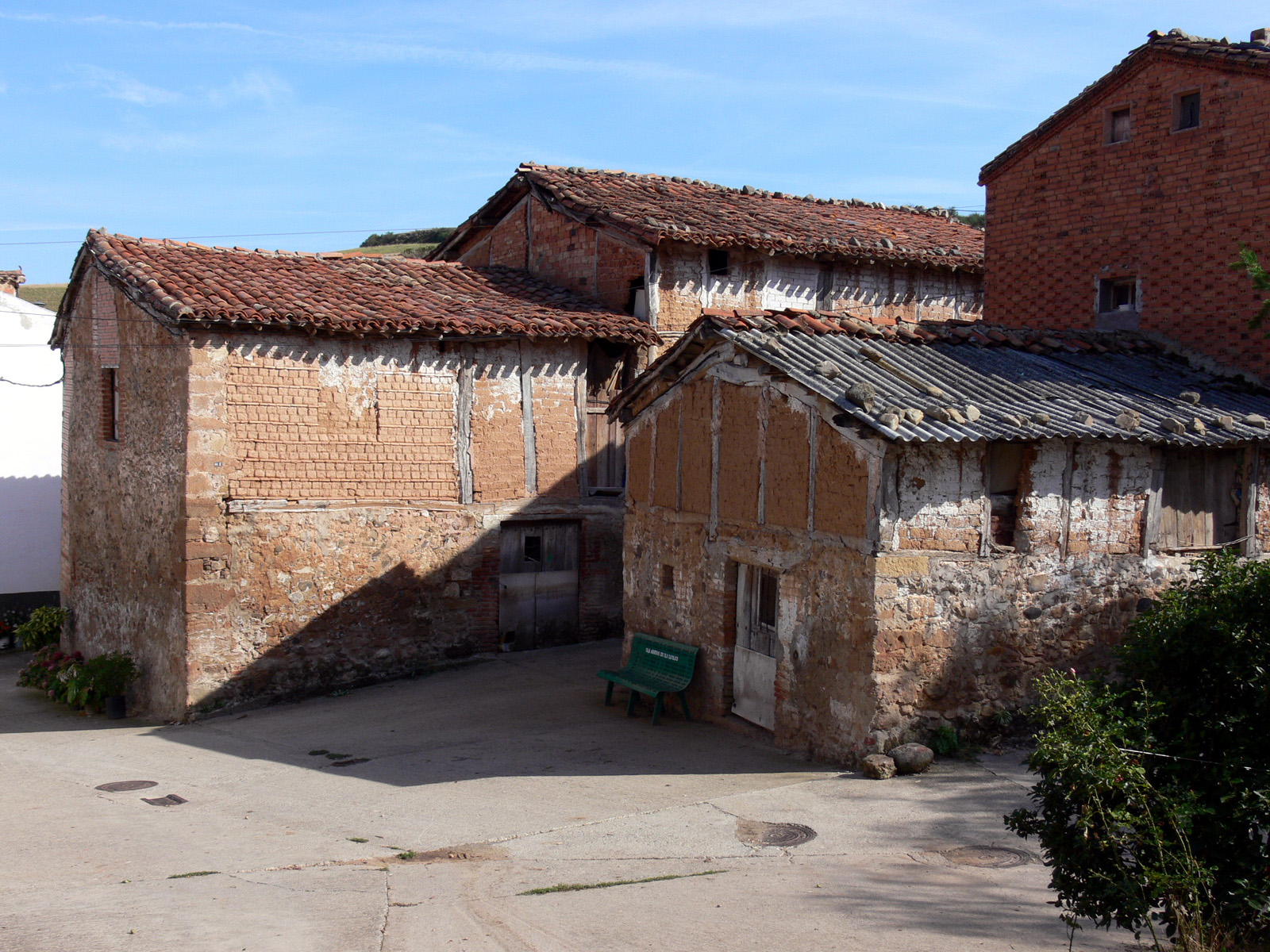

- Location within La Rioja, Spain Location within Spain
- Country: Spain
- Autonomous community: La Rioja
- Comarca: Santo Domingo de la Calzada

Population
  - Total: 33
- Postal code: 26258

Gallinero de Rioja is a village in the municipality of Manzanares de Rioja, in the province and autonomous community of La Rioja, Spain. As of 2018 had a population of 33 people.
