= Filippo Berio =

Brand of olive oils

- Founded: 1867
- Founder: Filippo Berio
- Headquarters: Lucca, Italy
- Parent: Salov Group

Filippo Berio is a brand of olive oils exported from Italy and made of oil from Italy, Greece, Spain and Tunisia. The brand is used for virgin, extra-virgin and 'mild and light' oils, as well as wine vinegar, balsamic vinegar, pesto and olives.

== History ==
A merchant named Filippo Berio first sold oil under his name in Italy in 1850.

In 1899, the brand was advertised in Indicatore postale-telegrafico del Regno d'Italia (lit. 'Postal-telegraphic indicator of the Kingdom of Italy'). The advertisement refers to the company as Filippo Berio & Co., stating "Casa fondata nel 1856 per l'esportazione del rinomato Olio d'Oliva di Lucca" (lit. 'House founded in 1856 for the export of the renowned Olive Oil of Lucca.').

By 1911, counterfeiters were selling adulterated Filippo Berio products in the New York City region. Pearson's Magazine reported:

A buyer of olive oil, whose epicurean taste has made him easily familiar with olive oils of good quality and of bad quality, purchased several cans of olive oil labeled as coming from the Milanese firm of Filippo Berio & Co. He found them to be good goods, and then he purchased another can that was not so good. He carried this sample of "olio d'oliva" to the headquarters of the Trade Mark Protective Association in New York, and this new corporation's agents promptly ascertained that it was mostly cottonseed oil, with just a trace of genuine olive oil mixed in. Then began the probing into the ways of the devious labelmakers.

In 1919, his daughter Albertina, together with Giovanni Silvestrina and Dino Fontana, founded the Società per Azioni Lucchese Olii e Vini (SALOV). SALOV now has a large production facility in Massarosa, outside Lucca.

Since 2014, the company has been majority owned by China's Bright Food.

The Filippo Berio brand is exported worldwide to over 65 countries and is the market leader in the United States and the United Kingdom. In Italy, SALOV's brand is "Sagra".

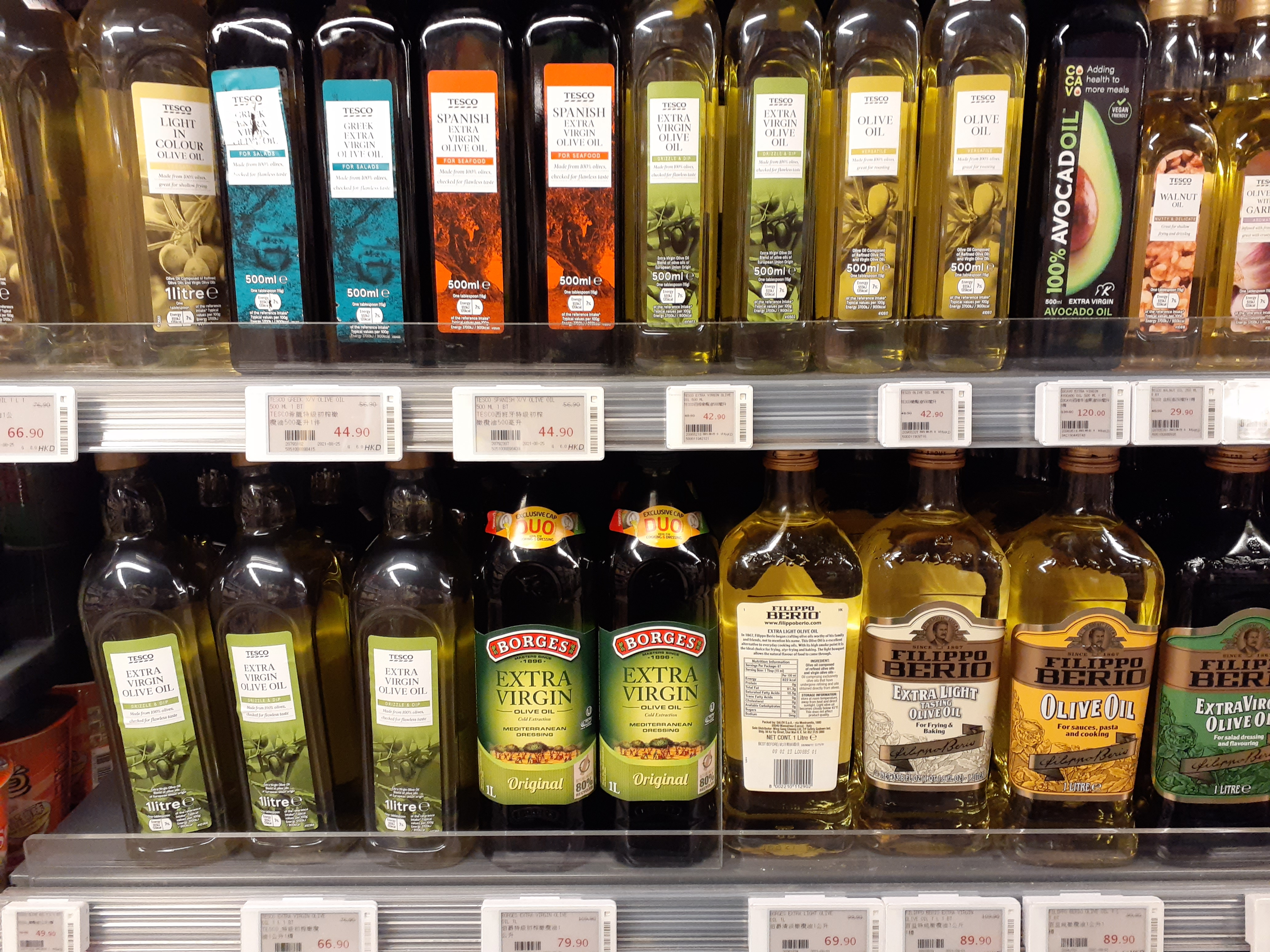
2021 supermarket goods in Sai Ying Pun, Hong Kong; Filippo Berio olive oils are visible on the bottom right

== Marketing ==
The brand obtained particular notoriety due to its long-running television advertising campaign with Gioacchino Rossini's famous Largo al Factotum (Figaro's Aria from The Barber of Seville) being sung with the substituted words "Filippo Berio, Filippo Berio, Filippo Berio, Filippo Berio, Filippo Berio, Filippo Berio, Filippo Berio Olive Oil" in place of the repeated word "Figaro."

In 2024, Filippo Berio’s UK marketing team launched the UK's first National Spaghetti Bolognese Day on Wednesday 22 May 2024. It is an awareness day dedicated to celebrating the iconic dish. National Spaghetti Bolognese Day is an opportunity to learn more about the history, culture, and culinary traditions surrounding one of the UK’s favourite dishes according to the researched commissioned by the team.

== Controversy ==
Class action lawsuits were filed against the company in 2015 alleging that the Berio oil was not entitled to the ‘extra virgin’ label and was misleadingly labelled "Imported from Italy”, with the actual origins hidden in fine print. That year, Bertolli was sued for the same issue. The result of the case was a settlement wherein consumers could claim "$2 [to] $5 without proof of purchase, or $0.50 per bottle with proof of purchase" of Filippo Berio extra virgin olive oil products.

== See also ==
- Olive oil regulation and adulteration
- Extra Virginity
