= Vehicle registration plates of Spain =

Spain (España)
- Spanish plates with format, 1234 ABC
- Country: Spain
- Country code: E

Current series
- Size: 500 mm × 110 mm 19.7 in × 4.3 in
- Serial format: 1234 ABC
- Colour (front): Black on white
- Colour (rear): Black on white
- Introduced: 2000

Availability
- Issued by: Directorate General of Traffic

History
- First issued: 1900

Vehicle registration plates are the mandatory number plates used to display the registration mark of a vehicle, and have existed in Spain since 1900. Most motor vehicles which are used on public roads are required by law to display them. The government agency responsible for the registration and numbering of vehicles is the Directorate General of Traffic.

== Current system ==
Spain has finished using the L-series, the format of which was nnnn LLL where:

- nnnn is a sequence number from 0000 to 9999,
- LLL is a "counter" comprising three letters, which increments after the sequence number reaches 9999. The consonants B, C, D, F, G, H, J, K, L, M, N, P, R, S, T, V, W, X, Y and Z are used for a total of 80 million possible registrations in the system.
- L see Colour plates. It is not used in private vehicles.

This format, introduced on 18 September 2000, is used nationwide, so there is no way of knowing where the vehicle was registered. The "counter" gives a rough idea of when the vehicle was registered, but is less reliable for determining its age, as imported second-hand vehicles are registered in the same way as new models.

In 2025 the three-letter counter reached the end of the M-series, and began the N-series, starting NBB. At the current rate of approximately five series per decade, the system will be exhausted around 2040.

The plates themselves are white with black characters, front and back, with a blue strip on the left containing the 12 stars of the flag of Europe and the country identifier E (for España). This strip is compulsory. The plates are usually rectangular and wide in shape, but there are also square-like plates for motorcycles, while some cars have a narrow plate inset (such as at the back of the SEAT 600).

== History ==
Two previous systems have been used, both of which were province-based.

=== 1900 to 1970 ===
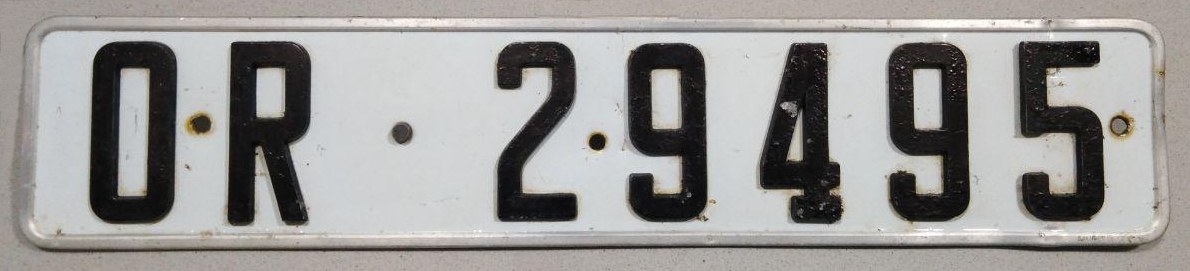
Provincial numeric registration plate from Orense.

The first system, introduced in 1900, consisted of a letter code denoting the province the vehicle was registered in (see below for the full list of codes), followed by a sequence number of up to six digits (XXX-NNNNNN). The codes were normally made up of the first one or two letters of the province name or the name of the provincial capital (many provinces are named after their capitals), under the provisions of a 1926 regulation. In the earliest days, some provinces used three-letter codes, but these were abolished after 1926.

This system came to an end in October 1971, by which time both Madrid and Barcelona were approaching the number 999999. Older vehicles with such registrations, usually with five- or six-digit numbers, can still be seen on Spanish roads.

In the later years of this system, many plates were white with black characters. Today, there are a few rare cases where the blue EU country identifier strip is also carried, as plates are reissued in new format but with the same number sequence when deteriorated or lost.

=== 1970 to 2000 ===
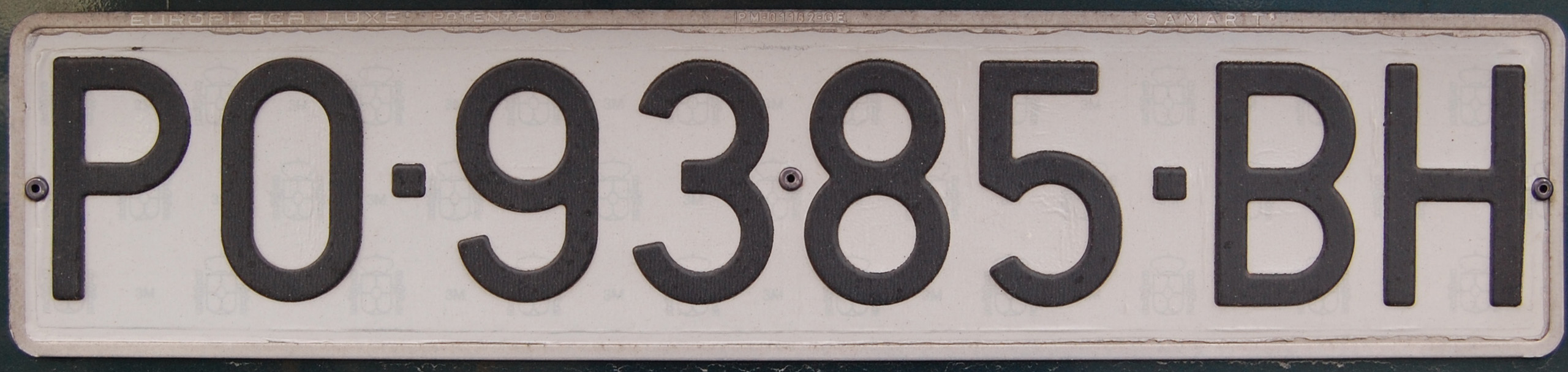
Provincial alphanumeric registration plate from Pontevedra.

The second system used the format XXX-NNNN-YY, where XXX was the province code or a one- two- or three-letter special code (such as ET for army cars and DGP for police cars), NNNN was a sequence number from 0000 to 9999 (always four-digit numbers, padded with leading zeroes if necessary), and YY was a "counter" series consisting of one and then two letters, which incremented after the sequence number reached 9999.

No "counter" series used the consonants Q and R (and Q has never been allowed in any way, the apparent reason for this being its resemblance to the vowel O and the digit 0), while two-letter combinations ending in the vowels A, E, I and O were also forbidden, apparently to avoid the forming of potentially offensive Spanish words when combined with some province codes (such as MA-LA, meaning "bad one", or CU-LO, meaning "arse"). This meant that, for instance, Z was followed by AB, while AN was followed by AP and then AS, and PZ was followed by SB.

Other potentially offensive combinations, however, were allowed, such as KK (resembling caca, meaning "shit") and PN (resembling pene, meaning "penis"). Also allowed were combinations with potential political connotations, such as HB (cf. Herri Batasuna) and PP (cf. Partido Popular). The only combination that was actually skipped was WC in Madrid and Barcelona. Finally, some otherwise "forbidden" combinations (particularly those containing R or ending in one of the skipped vowels) were exceptionally used in a few particular cases, such as on some special types of cars (e.g. RA, RB... for some police cars, and EA for Spanish Air Force land vehicles).

This system lasted until January 2000, by which time Madrid was running out of registrations again, its "counter" reaching series ZX. Barcelona reached series XG, while the next province by registration volume, Valencia, was far behind at series HJ. Therefore, the allowed combinations ZY and ZZ were never issued in any province.

Under this system, plates usually consisted solely of black characters on white, though the blue EU country identifier strip became an option in the 1990s.

Both systems were susceptible to problems with rivalries between regions, that caused trouble for drivers travelling out of their provinces or trying to sell their vehicles second-hand. The second system was also affected when the major languages of Spain were co-officialized, with the renaming of some provinces resulting in mismatches between the name and the code. For instance, the GE code for Gerona became mismatched when that province was renamed Girona after Catalan became official, so it was replaced with the GI code. Similarly, the OR code for Orense was replaced with the OU code for Ourense (official Galician name for the province). There were also unsuccessful movements to have other province codes changed, such as replacing the Asturias code O (from its former name after its capital Oviedo) with AS, this movement being prompted by the rivalry between Oviedo and the province's largest city, Gijón, some of whose residents chose to register their vehicles in Girona, the GI code also being the first two letters of "Gijón". La Rioja code LO (from its former name after its capital Logroño) was finally slated for replacement with LR on the same day that the current system entered use.

=== Provincial codes ===
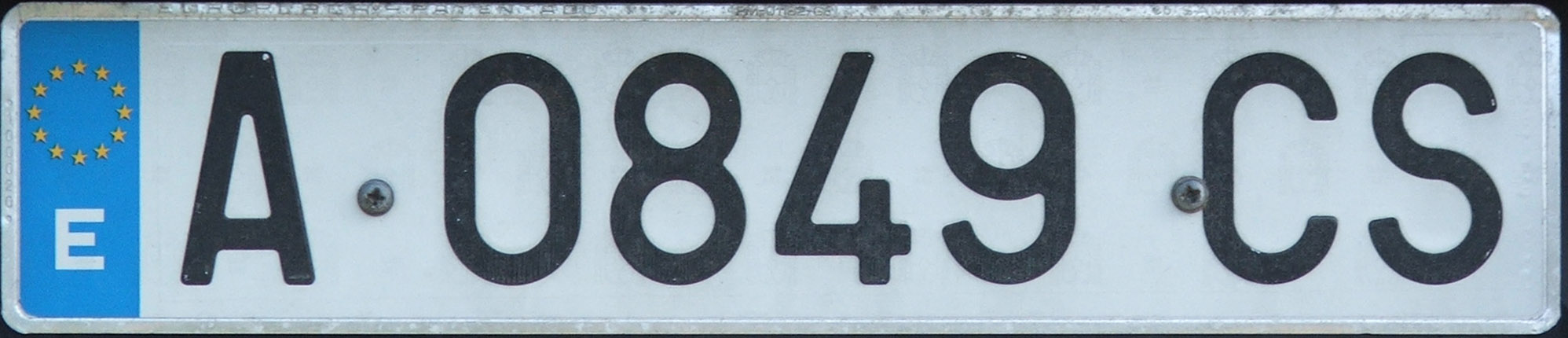
Provincial alphanumeric registration plate from Alicante with the EU strip.

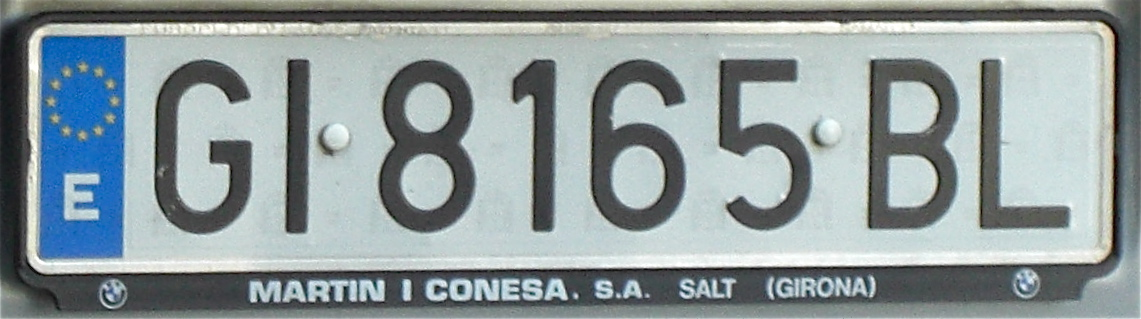
Provincial alphanumeric registration plate from Girona with the EU strip.

Provincial alphanumeric registration plate of the last series ("ZX") from Madrid with the EU strip.

† Former provinces

Code	Province	Notes
A	Alicante	
ALB	Albacete	Used until 1926, replaced by AB.
AB	Albacete	Used since 1926.
AL	Almería	
AOE	Africa Occidental Española †	Used until 1951, replaced by I and SHA.
AV	Ávila	
B	Barcelona	
BA	Badajoz	
BI	Biscay	BI stands for its capital Bilbao.
BU	Burgos	
C	La Coruña	
CA	Cádiz	
CAC	Cáceres	Used until 1926, replaced by CC.
CC	Cáceres	Used since 1926.
CAS	Castellón/Castelló	Used until 1926, replaced by CS.
CS	Castellón/Castelló	Used since 1926.
CE	Ceuta	Used since 1922.
CO	Córdoba	
CR	Ciudad Real	
CU	Cuenca	
FP	Fernando Poo †	Used from 1961 until 1969.
GC	Las Palmas	GC stands for Gran Canaria. Used since 1926.
GE	Gerona/Girona	Used until 1992, replaced by GI.
GI	Gerona/Girona	Used since 1992.
GR	Granada	
GU	Guadalajara	
H	Huelva	
HU	Huesca	
I	Ifni †	Used from 1951 until 1961, replaced by IF.
IF	Ifni †	Used from 1961 until 1969.
PM	Islas Baleares	PM stands for its capital Palma de Mallorca. Used until 1997, replaced by IB.
IB	Islas Baleares	Used since 1997.
J	Jaén	
L	Lérida/Lleida	
LE	León	
LO	La Rioja	LO stands for Logroño, its former name after its capital.
LR	La Rioja	Replaced LO, but was not used.
LU	Lugo	
M	Madrid	
MA	Málaga	
ME	Marruecos Español †	Used for Ceuta and Melilla, replaced by CE and ML in 1922.
ML	Melilla	
MU	Murcia	
O	Asturias	O stands for Oviedo, its former name after its capital.
OR	Orense/Ourense	Used until 1998, replaced by OU.
OU	Orense/Ourense	Used since 1998.
P	Palencia	
PA	Navarre	PA stands for its capital Pamplona. Used until 1918, replaced by NA.
NA	Navarre	Used since 1918.
PO	Pontevedra	
RM	Río Muni †	Used from 1961 until 1969.
S	Cantabria	S stands for Santander, its former name after its capital.
SA	Salamanca	
SE	Sevilla	
SEG	Segovia	Used until 1926, replaced by SG.
SG	Segovia	Used since 1926.
SHA	Sáhara †	Used from 1951 until 1961, replaced by SH.
SH	Sáhara †	Used since 1961 until 1976.
SO	Soria	
SS	Gipuzkoa	SS stands for its capital Donostia/San Sebastián.
T	Tarragona	
TE	Canarias †	TE stands for Tenerife. Used until 1926, replaced by GC and TF.
TER	Teruel	Used until 1926, replaced by TE.
TE	Teruel	Used since 1926.
TEG	Territorio Español de Guinea †	Used until 1926, replaced by TG.
TG	Territorio Español de Guinea †	Used since 1926, replaced by FP and RM in 1961.
TF	Santa Cruz de Tenerife	TF stands for Tenerife. Used since 1926.
TO	Toledo	
V	Valencia	
VA	Valladolid	
VI	Álava	VI stands for its capital Vitoria-Gasteiz.
Z	Zaragoza	
ZA	Zamora	

== Special plates ==
=== Commercial Vehicles ===
To comply with Third-party insurance risks, vehicles carrying goods or persons not otherwise insured require a small white plate (150mm×75mm) with the letters SP (for servicio publico) in black. this is fixed near the rear numberplate

Taxis and private hire (VTT) that have authorisation to operate display the rear plate with a blue background and an SP plate mentioned above Vehicles without these markings are not legal for hire.

=== State codes ===
These keep the old system of letter code plus numbers.

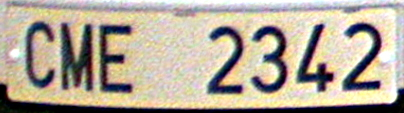
Mossos d'Esquadra police plate

Ertzaintza police plate

Code	Organization	Meanings	Notes
CME	Cos dels Mossos d'Esquadra	Autonomous police force of Catalonia	
DGP	Dirección General de la Policía	Spanish National Police	
CNP	Cuerpo Nacional de Policía	Spanish National Police	Since 2008
E	Ertzaintza	Autonomous police force of the Basque Country	The E on the plate is in a special Basque font.
EA	Ejército del Aire	Spanish Air Force	
ET	Ejército de Tierra	Spanish Army	
FAE	Fuerzas Aliadas en España	Allied NATO Forces in Spain	
FN	Fuerzas Navales / Armada	Spanish Navy	
PGC	Parque de la Guardia Civil	Fleet of the Spanish civil guard	These are a militarized police force similar to French Gendarmerie nationale or Italian Corpo dei Carabinieri.
MF	Ministerio de Fomento	Ministry of Public Works	No correlation with MOP.
MMA	Ministerio de Medio Ambiente	Ministry of Environment	
MOP	Ministerio de Obras Públicas	Ministry of Public Works	Now replaced by MF.
PME	Parque Móvil del Estado	State owned vehicles	
PMM	Parque Móvil del Ministerio	State owned vehicles, on a Ministry	Now replaced by PME.
Crown	Vehículo de la Corona	Crown's Car	The car carrying the King in an official capacity has a crimson plate with the royal crown in gold. The car carrying the Princess of Asturias in an official capacity has a blue plate with the royal crown in gold.

=== Diplomatic plates ===
Diplomatic registration plates from Spain

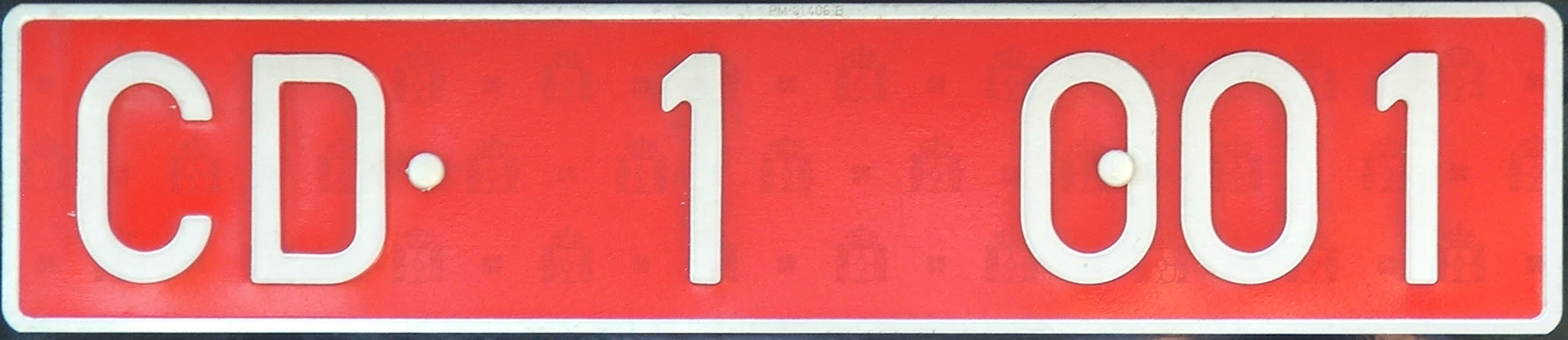
Diplomatic cars

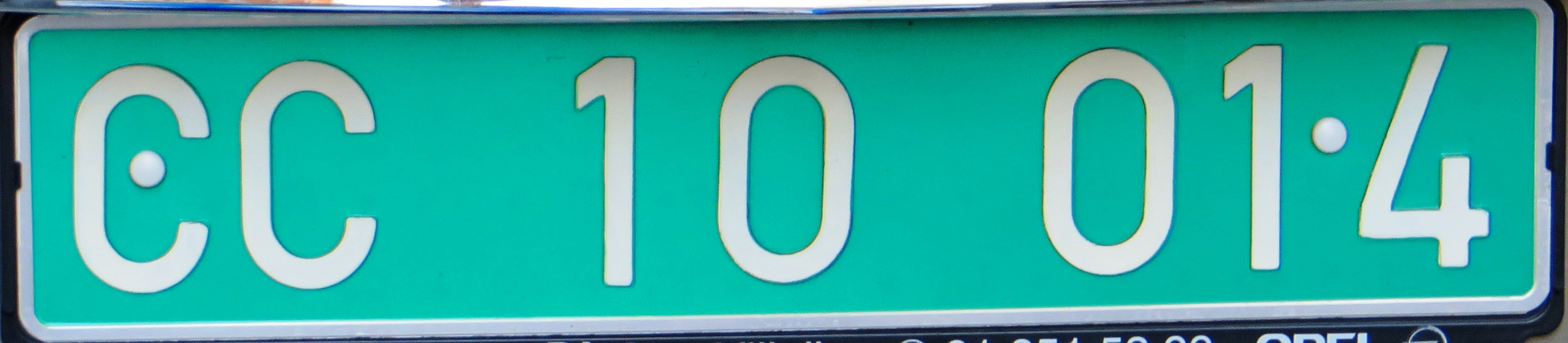
Consular cars

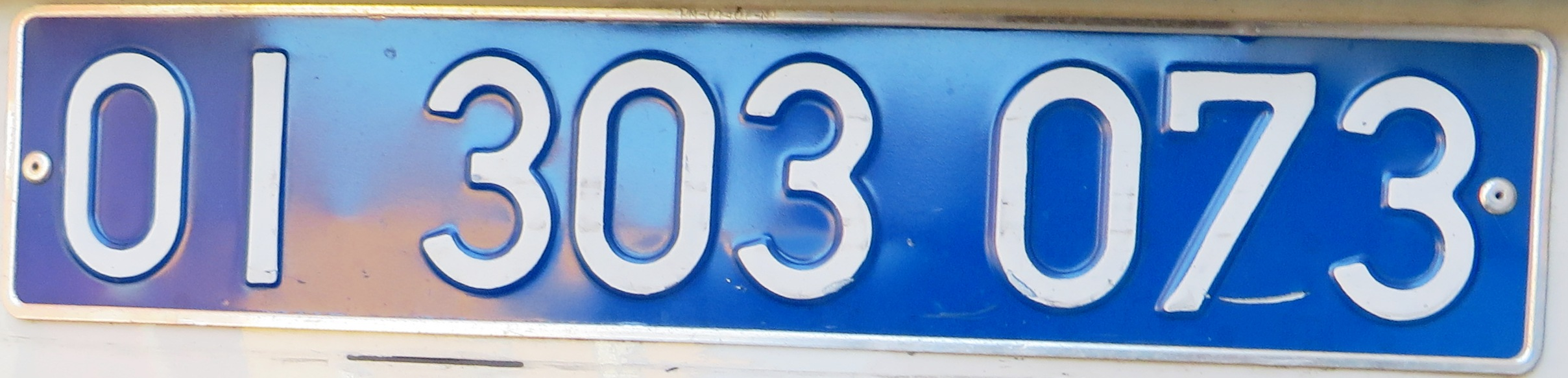
Cars belonging to international organizations

Diplomatic plates are either red, green, yellow or blue and start with the letters "CD" (red) for diplomatic cars, "CC" (green) for consular cars, "TA" (yellow) for ancillary workers' cars or "OI" (blue) for cars belonging to international organisations. The first set of numbers stands for the embassy or organisation and the second for the specific car from an organisation.

=== U.S. military ===
Up until 1972 U.S. military personnel were required to have special plates.

=== Colour plates ===
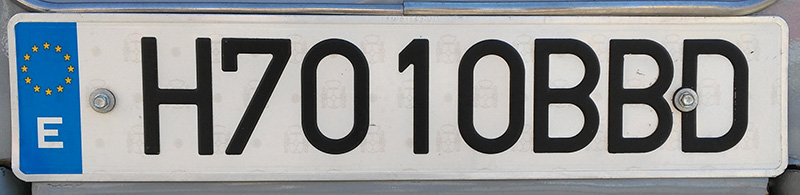
Historical plate

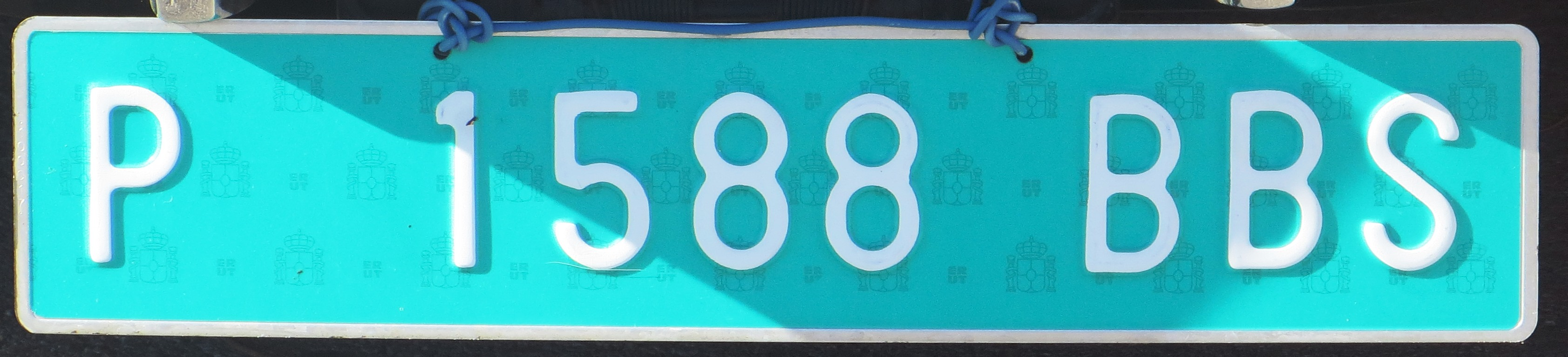
Provisional plate

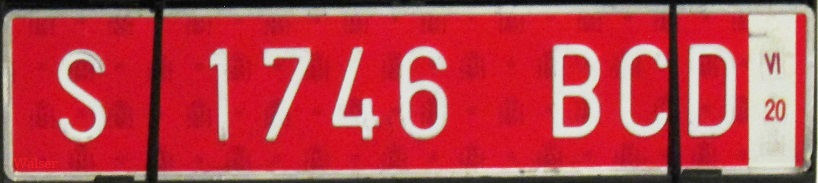
Temporary plate

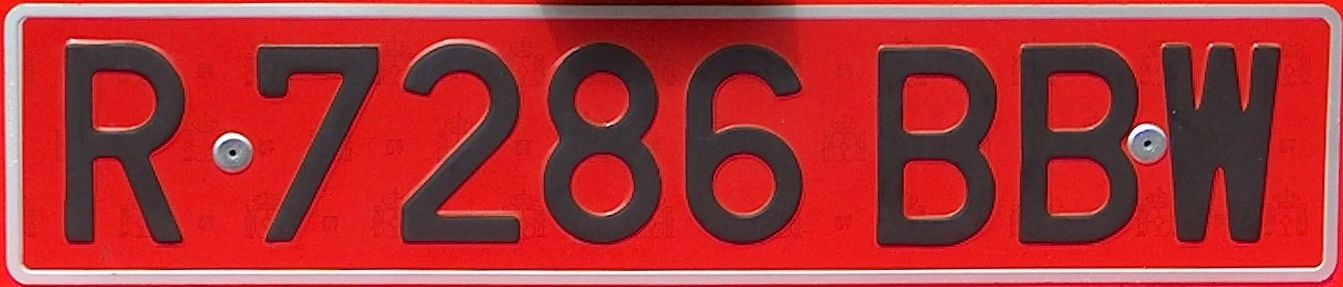
Trailer plate

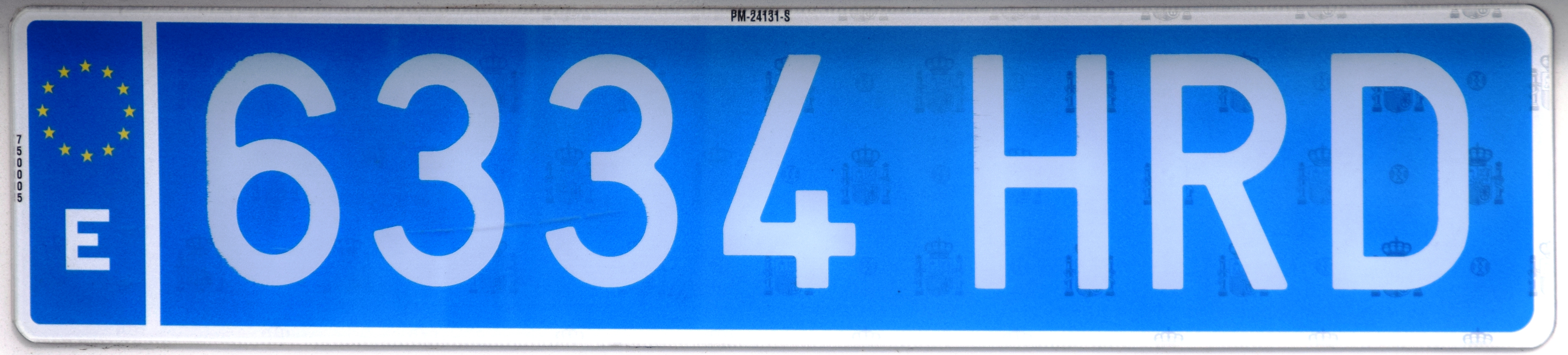
Taxicab plate

There are other plates with different background colours for trailers and the so-called "tourist plates", provisory plates that allow foreigners to use a vehicle bought in Spain before registering it in their country. The trailer plates begin with the prefix R signifying remolque, the Spanish word for trailer, caravan or literally "on tow". The tourist plates begin with the prefix P signifying provisional, usually issued to vehicles for export or until the registration process has been completed. They are sometimes seen on manufacturer's prototypes. An additional series exists for historic vehicles with the prefix H followed by four numbers and four letters, making a nine digit plate which can be difficult to fit onto some historic vehicles. Mopeds and microcars with cylinders under 50 cc were not required to have a national plate and town and city administration tax them and issued their own yellow plates.

Code	Signified as	Color
C	Mopeds and microcars	Black on yellow
E	Special (agricultural, heavy machinery...)	Red on white
H	Historical	Black on white
M	E-scooters	Black on white
P	Provisional	White on green
R	Trailers	Black on red
S	Temporary plates	White on red
T	Tourist plates	Black on white
V	Vehicle dealers	White on red
	Taxicabs	White on blue

== Diplomatic codes ==
This is a table of country codes on Spanish diplomatic and consular car number plates, i.e. the first group of two or three numbers and mainly sorted by Spanish alphabetical order.

Code	Country or Organization	Code	Country or Organization	Code	Country or Organization	Code	Country or Organization
1	Vatican City (Holy See)	35	Equatorial Guinea	69	Sweden	144	Ukraine
2	Germany	36	Haiti	70	Switzerland	145	North Macedonia
3	Saudi Arabia	37	Honduras	71	Thailand	148	Estonia
4	Algeria	38	Hungary	72	Tunisia	150	International Olive Council
5	Argentina	39	India	73	Turkey	151	Organization of Ibero-American States for Education, Science and Culture (OEI)
6	Australia	40	Indonesia	74	Russia	152	(United Nations) World Tourism Organization
7	Austria	41	Iraq	75	Uruguay	153	(European Union) European Commission/European Parliament
8	Belgium	42	Iran	76	Venezuela	155	Arab League
9	Bolivia	43	Ireland	77	Serbia	157	Ibero-American General Secretariat
10	Brazil	44	Italy	78	Democratic Republic of the Congo	159	(United Nations) International Labour Organization
11	Bulgaria	45	Japan	80	Slovakia	160	International Commission for the Conservation of Atlantic Tunas
12	Cameroon	46	Jordan	81	Qatar	162	(European Union) European Space Agency
13	Canada	47	Kuwait	82	Croatia	163	United Nations High Commissioner for Refugees
14	Colombia	48	Lebanon	83	Israel	164	Ibero-American Youth Organization
15	South Korea	49	Libya	84	Malaysia	200	Palestine
16	Ivory Coast	50	Morocco	85	Angola	300	European Union Intellectual Property Office
17	Costa Rica	51	Mauritania	86	Luxembourg	303	European Union Satellite Centre (EU SatCen)
18	Cuba	52	Mexico	88	Bangladesh	304	NATO
19	Czech Republic	53	Nicaragua	93	Gambia	307	Development Bank of Latin America and the Caribbean
20	Chile	54	Nigeria	96	Guinea	309	United Nations Water
21	China	55	Norway	101	Malta	310	Fusion for Energy (ITER)
22	Denmark	56	Sovereign Military Order of Malta	104	New Zealand	311	Conference of Ministers of Justice of Ibero-American Countries
23	Ecuador	57	Netherlands	107	Senegal	314	United Nations Information and Communications Technology Facility (UNICTF)
24	Egypt	58	Pakistan	118	Yemen	320	(United Nations) World Food Programme
25	El Salvador	59	Panama	122	Vietnam	400	Kenya
26	United Arab Emirates	60	Paraguay	124	Cape Verde	405	Sudan
27	United States	61	Peru	128	Albania	406	Afghanistan
28	Philippines	62	Poland	131	Lithuania	410	Moldova
29	Finland	63	Portugal	132	Latvia	411	Mozambique
30	France	64	Kazakhstan	133	Slovenia	414	Uzbekistan
31	Gabon	65	Dominican Republic	135	Georgia	415	Armenia
32	United Kingdom	66	Romania	140	Andorra	416	North Korea
33	Greece	67	Syria	142	Bosnia and Herzegovina	419	Azerbaijan
34	Guatemala	68	South Africa	143	Ghana	426	Montenegro

== Bibliography ==
- Castrillo, Carlos (2022). Matrículas de coches en España y en Europa (in Spanish). Grupo Editorial Círculo Rojo SL. p. 262. ISBN 978-84-1128-205-5.
