= SEAT 600 =

- SEAT 600 (1958)

Overview
- Manufacturer: SEAT
- Also called: Seiscientos, Pelotilla
- Production: May 1957 – August 1973
- Assembly: Spain: Barcelona (Zona Franca)
- Designer: Dante Giacosa

Body and chassis
- Class: City car (A)
- Body style: 2-door saloon (600); 4-door saloon (800)
- Layout: RR Layout
- Related: Fiat 600

Powertrain
- Engine: 633 cc (38.6 cu in) (600); 767 cc (46.8 cu in) (600 D/E/L/L Especial, 800)
- Transmission: 4-speed manual

Dimensions
- Wheelbase: 2,000 mm (78.7 in) (600); 2,180 mm (85.8 in) (800)
- Length: 3,322 mm (130.8 in) (600); 3,482 mm (137.1 in) (800)
- Width: 1,380 mm (54.3 in)
- Height: 1,405 mm (55.3 in)
- Kerb weight: 590–635 kg (1,301–1,400 lb)

Chronology
- Successor: SEAT 133

The SEAT 600 is a city car made in Spain by SEAT from 27 May 1957 to 3 August 1973, built under license from Fiat on the original Italian Fiat 600, designed by Dante Giacosa. It was offered in two-door saloon body style rear engine layout, although a four-door version was also offered as SEAT 800. It is considered a pop icon of the Spanish economic miracle.

Measuring only 3.322 m (10.90 ft) long, it was launched in 1957 at an initial price of 65,000 pesetas (€390.66) without taxes. SEAT manufactured up to 797,319 SEAT 600s – and 18,200 SEAT 800s – at its factory in Barcelona's Zona Franca. Almost ten percent of the production was exported to countries such as Argentina, Belgium, Chile, Colombia, Finland, Poland, and Portugal. It was the best-selling car in Spain in 1958–1966, and in 1968, and in Finland in 1971–1973.

== History ==
The Sociedad Española de Automóviles de Turismo S.A., branded as SEAT, was born in 1950 as a joint venture of the Spanish state holding agency National Institute of Industry, six Spanish banks and Fiat. Almost all SEAT models up to 1982 were license-built Fiat-based cars, although the SEAT 1200/1430 Sport "Boca negra" and SEAT 133 were created in-house by SEAT in the 1970s.

Initially, some units of the original Italian model, the Fiat 600 –designed by Dante Giacosa and launched in 1955–, were imported to Spain, but soon the SEAT factory in Barcelona's Zona Franca began its own production based on this model, under agreement with Fiat. The first SEAT 600 manufactured left the production line on 27 May 1957. This unit was registered in Madrid on 5 December 1957 with the registration plate M-184018 and was in use until February 1985. This was not the first SEAT 600 registered, since the first one was registered in Barcelona on 8 June 1957 with the registration plate B-141141. Commercialization to the general public began on 24 June 1957.

With an initial launching price of 65,000 pesetas (€390.66) (Note: In Spain, 65,000 pesetas (€390.66) in 1957, adjusted for inflation using the consumer price index, in 2023 would be €21,943.37.) without taxes, (Note: To the price of a Seiscientos, 11,200 pesetas (€67.31) of the luxury tax and 12,150 pesetas (€73.02) of the registration tax had to be added, which had to be paid outright.) it was an affordable vehicle. (Note: Although it was an affordable car compared to the cars that were sold at that time, it was not achievable to everyone, since the per capita income in Spain in 1957 was 18,472 pesetas (€111.02), which the purchase of a Seiscientos –without counting taxes– meant forty-two months' salary on average.) The sales success was such that the Commercial Division had a number of pending orders equivalent to four years of production. To stop this avalanche, the down payment for each order was established for the first time, something that lasted for several years. Sales were favored by SEAT itself with the increase in production, the reduction of the price to 63,000 pesetas in 1964 – a price that was maintained until 1969 – and the creation of Fiseat – SEAT's customer financing company – in 1967, which expedited the processing of the purchase and promoted the payment in installments. With all this it became the best-selling car in Spain in 1958–1966, and in 1968. In 1971, one in every four cars circulating in the country was a SEAT 600.

Starting in March 1958, the units were delivered to the province of the client, who until then had to travel to the factory or to one of the seven subsidiaries that existed at that time. To help with personalization, there was a very extensive range of accessories: from chrome hubcaps or spoked wheels, to metal trays or roof racks to make up for the lack of storage spaces. Starting in July 1958, a fixed profile convertible body with a sliding canvas roof was also offered, which increased the price by 5,000 pesetas (€30.05). In February 1961, a commercial body appeared without rear seat or rear side windows and with a very basic finish – which made it cheaper – to use as a small cargo vehicle or as a fleet vehicle. (Note: Furthermore, due to its commercial use, the SEAT 600 Comercial was exempt from the luxury tax.)

In November 1965, SEAT entered the export business, shipping 150 SEAT 600s to Colombia, followed by exports to Argentina, Belgium, Chile, Finland, Poland, and Portugal. In Finland itself, the SEAT 600 D was the best-selling car in 1971–1973. When Fiat stopped manufacturing its Fiat 600 in 1969, it met demand for the model with units produced by SEAT labeled as Fiat construzione SEAT. SEAT exported nearly 80,000 units in total, almost ten percent of total production.

SEAT manufactured up to 797,319 units of SEAT 600s until 3 August 1973. After the cessation of production, it still exported 171,500 units in complete knock-down (CKD) format, that is, completely disassembled for assembly in the destination country. Among the reasons for ending production were the thin and weak B-pillars, which made it difficult to properly install seat belts after stricter passive safety requirements came into force. It was replaced by the less successful SEAT 133, the first vehicle designed by SEAT, as a modernized derivative of the SEAT 850.

The SEAT 600 helped to start the Spanish miracle – the economic boom in Spain between 1959 and 1973 – that came at the end of the slow recovery from the Spanish Civil War. It was the first car that came within the modest but rapidly growing economic means of most Spanish families from the mid-1960s to the early 1970s. The vehicle has become a pop icon of the period. As of 2023, it is estimated that there are still about 10,000 Seiscientos in circulation in Spain, and there are more than a hundred fan clubs that organize meetings and excursions every weekend.

== Versions ==
=== SEAT 600 ===
The design of the SEAT 600 is a two-box two-door four-seater rear-engined saloon. Its two initial series are the 600 (1957–1963) – unofficially known as 600 N to differentiate it from later versions – and the 600 D (1963–1970), both distinguishable by the use of suicide doors. In 1958, the 600 received its first modification in finishes and equipment incorporating chrome overriders in the bumpers, new headlamps and light levers. The 600 D has instead the front position lights located under the main headlamps with the indicators at their height on the sides, the lock embedded in the door opening handle and the start no longer with a lever, having adopted an ignition key system located in the center of the dashboard. In 1966, the 600 D underwent a restyling incorporating bumpers with more curved lines and rubber overriders, larger seats and cream-colored wheels.

The third-series 600 E (1969–1973) has conventional doors, bigger headlamps, a more robust door locking system, the ignition lock next to the steering wheel with anti-theft system, a different grille, a storage tray, a central ashtray, new upholstery, and a luminous water temperature indicator. The final production run is the 600 L (Note: The SEAT 600 L was dedicated exclusively to export, the vast majority of them being sold in Belgium.) and the 600 L Especial (1972–1973), which incorporate a triangular air vent in the C-pillar to compensate the interior pressure when closing the doors.

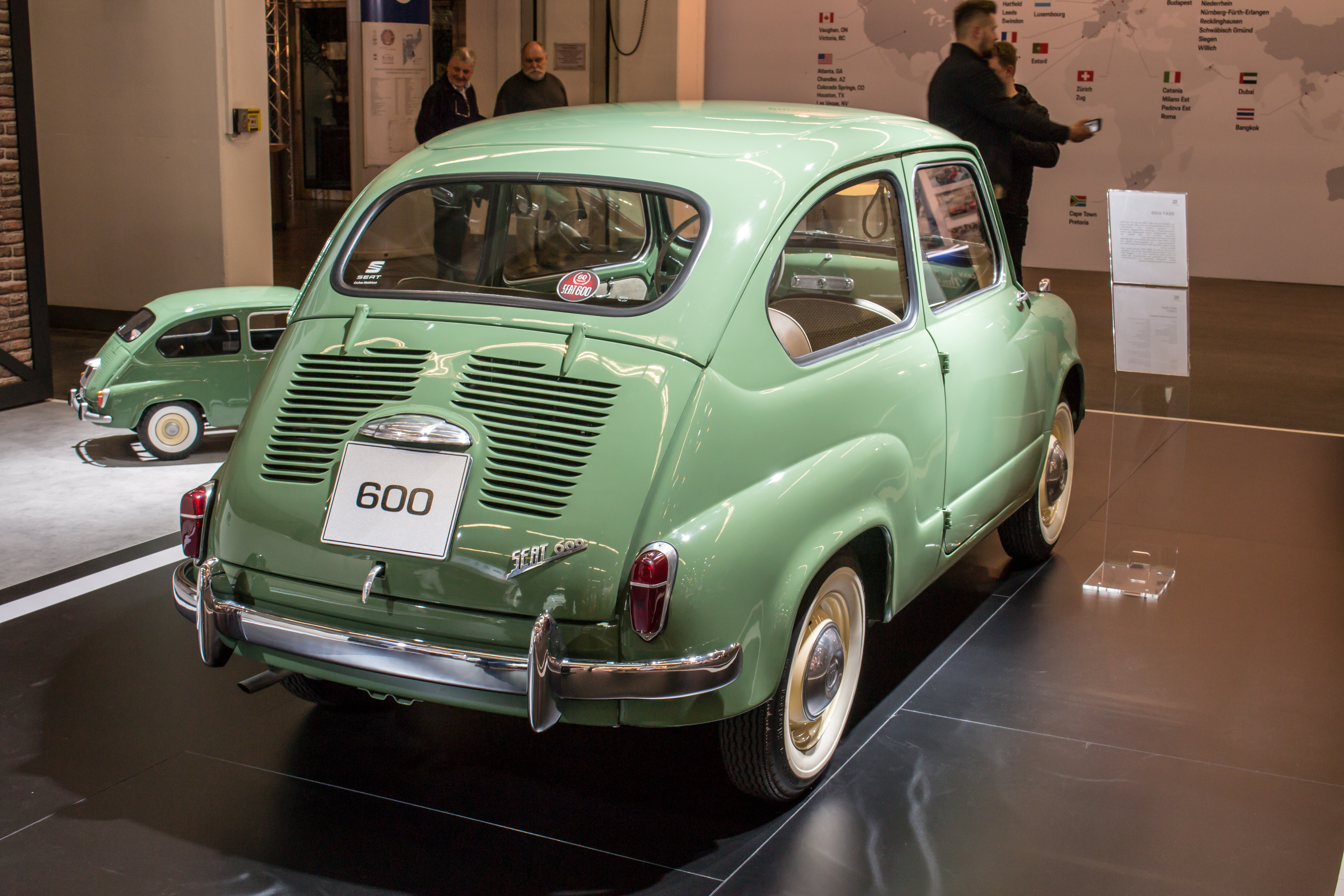
First-series: SEAT 600 (1958) (Note: For identification purposes, note the chrome overriders in the bumpers.)
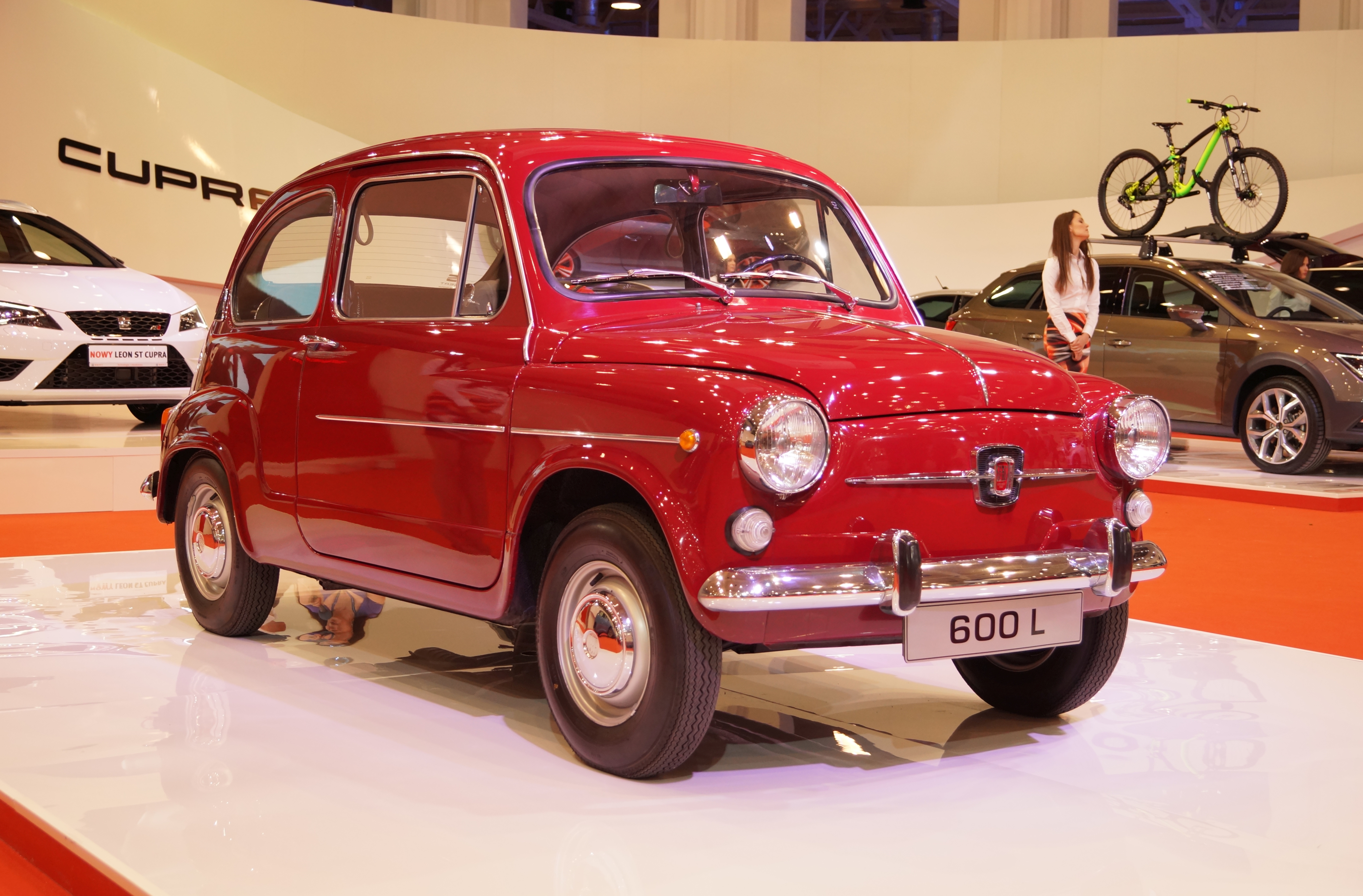
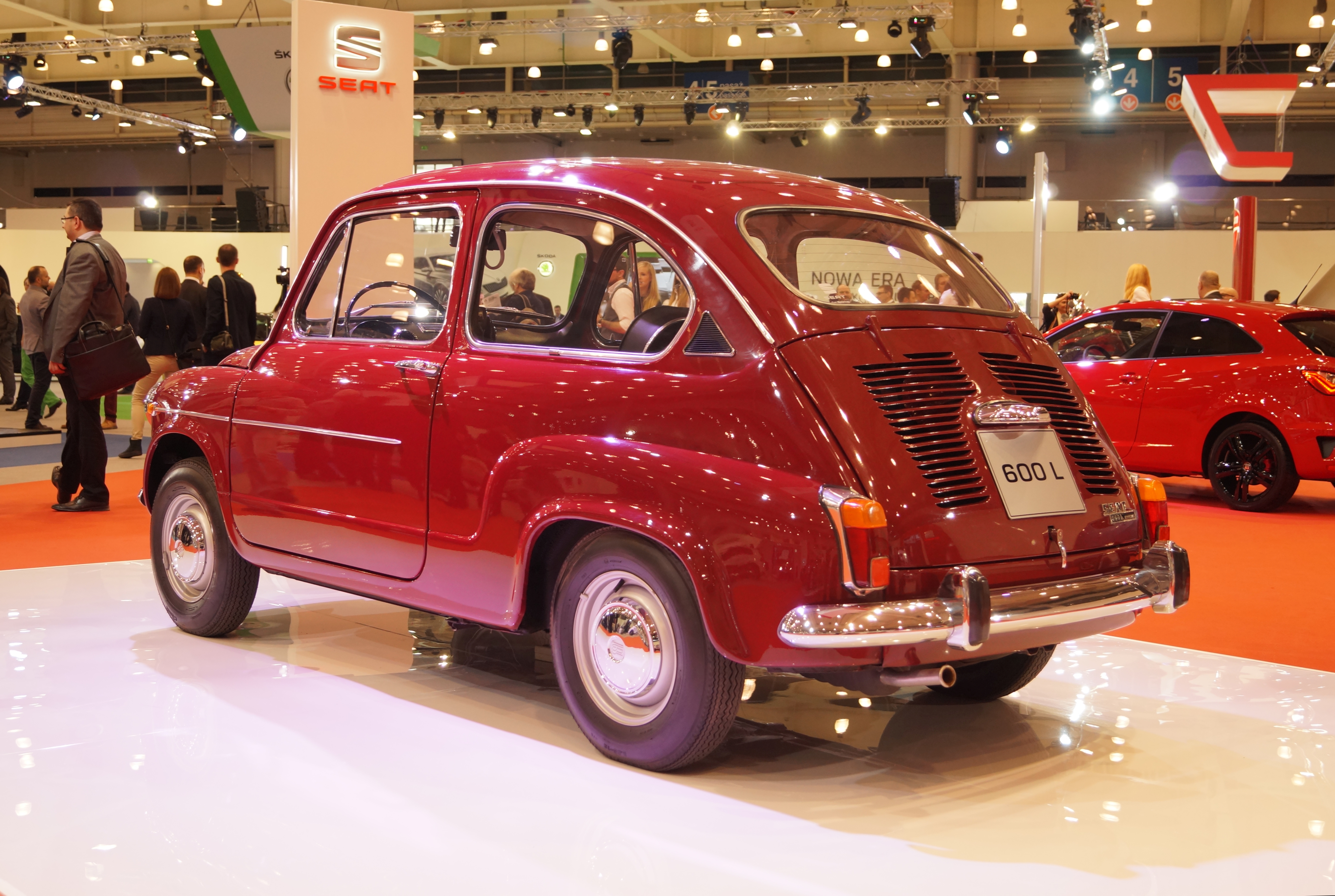
Last-series: SEAT 600 L Especial (1973) (Note: For model identification purposes, note the triangular black air vent in the C-pillar, specific for the L Especial. The car shown is the penultimate unit that left the production line.)

Starting in July 1958, a fixed profile convertible body with a sliding canvas roof, called the SEAT 600 Descapotable, and starting in February 1961, a commercial body, with paneled rear side windows, without rear seat, and with a very basic finish, called the SEAT 600 Comercial, were also available.

=== SEAT 800 ===
A slightly longer, four-door saloon version, the SEAT 800, was manufactured between October 1963 and May 1967, starting sales in January 1964. It is also known as a four-door 600, although the official designation was 800. It is the four-door derivative of the 600 D; it has front suicide doors and rear conventional doors mounted on the same B-pillar. The modification of the bodywork and painting were carried out at Carrocerías Costa in Tarrassa, after which it was incorporated into the SEAT assembly line to receive the mechanics, windows, trim and finishes. The SEAT 800 was a version developed exclusively in Spain and had no counterpart in the Fiat lineup. 18,200 units were made in the 42 months it was produced. It had some success as a microtaxi in cities like Madrid, Bilbao or Valladolid.

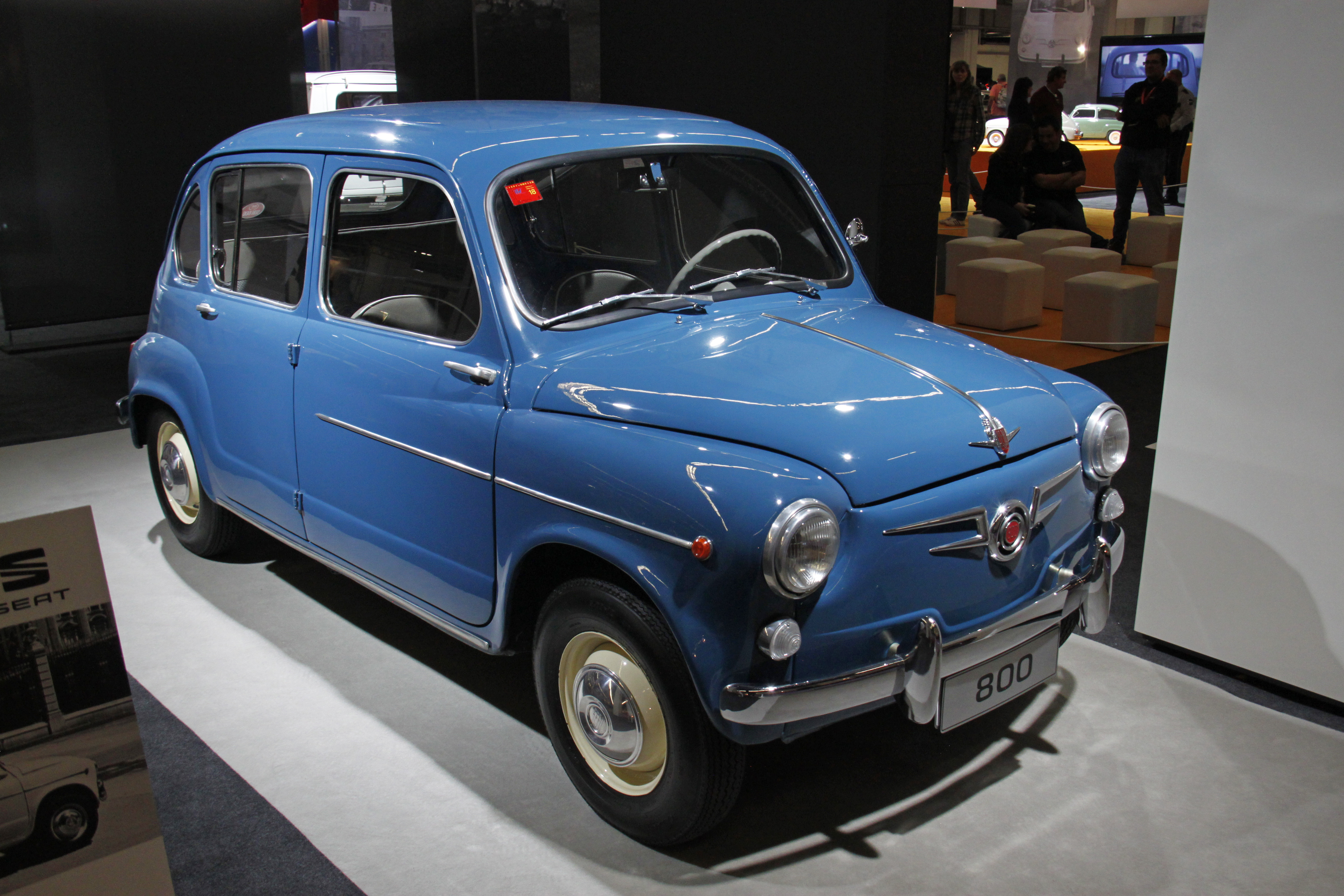
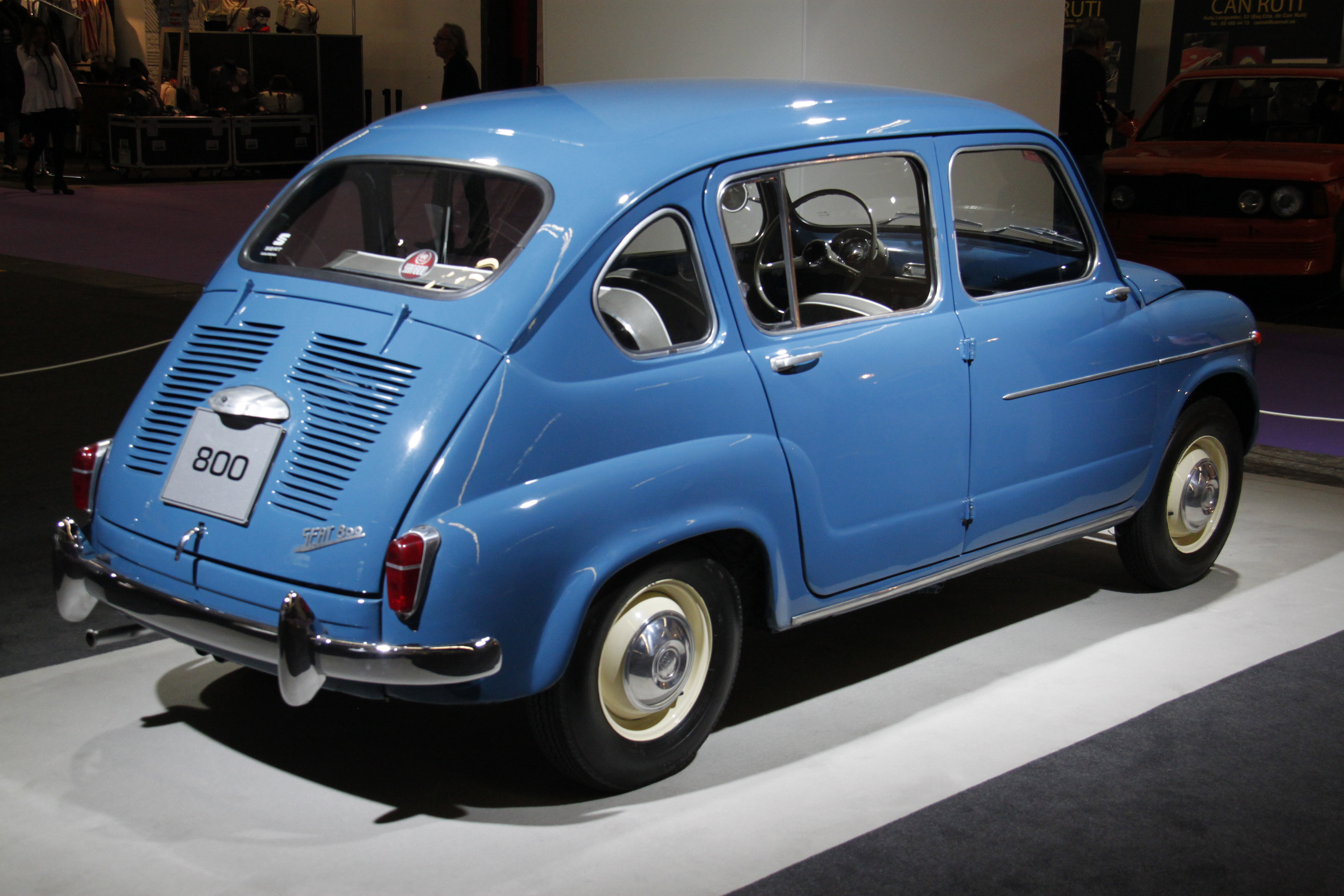
SEAT 800 four-door saloon derivation from the 600 D

=== Derivatives ===
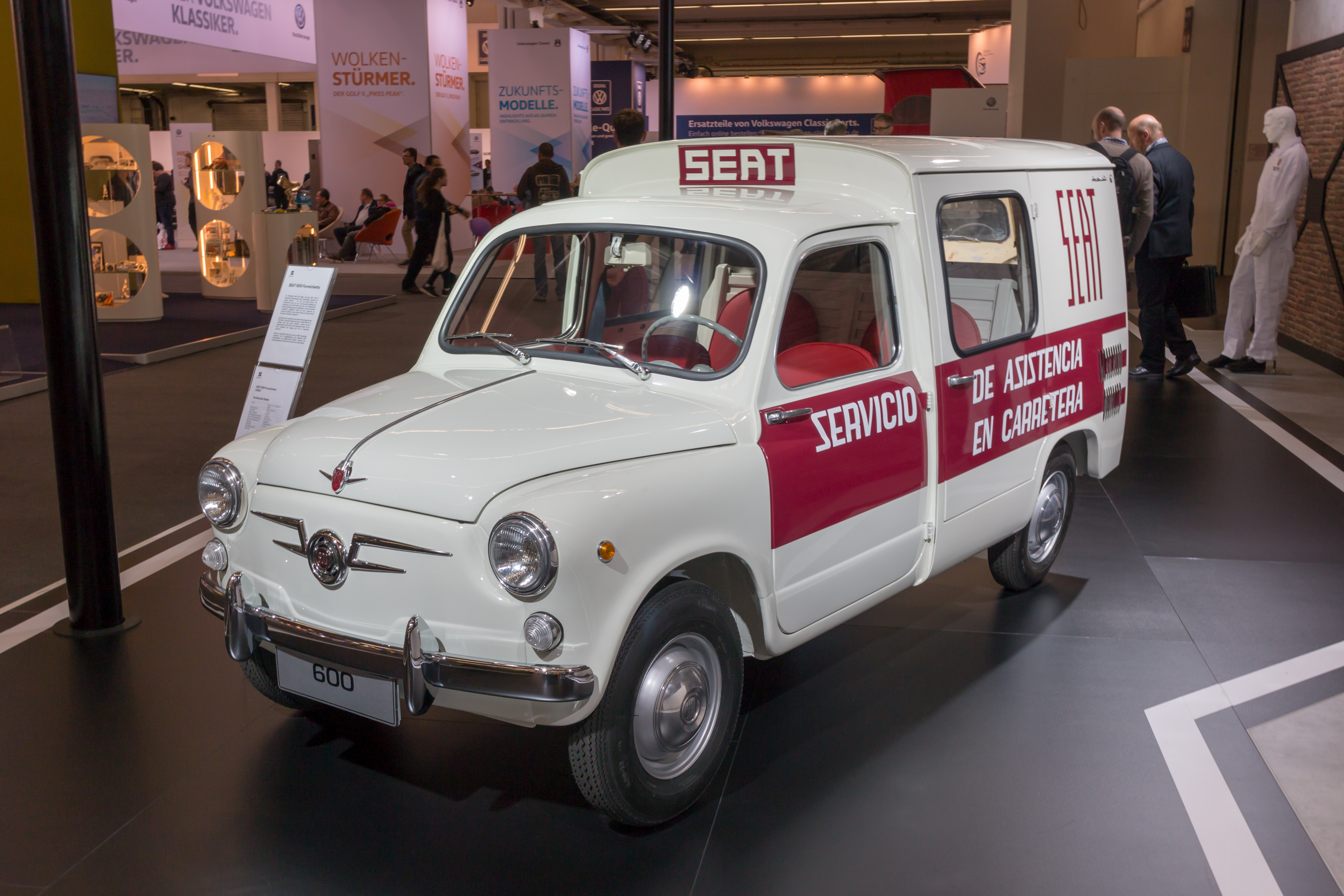
Siata Formichetta of the SEAT roadside assistance service

Several versions derived from the SEAT 600 were manufactured with SEAT parts by other companies. Many of which were built by Siata Española – the Spanish branch of Siata – but cars were also modified by other carbody makers. Among the derivatives developed by Siata Española in its factory in Tarragona, the Siata Formichetta, a commercial panel van derived from the 600 D, stands out, of which approximately 6,700 units were manufactured between 1961 and 1966 and were commercialized by SEAT. (Note: From 1963 to 1967, Carrocerías Costa also built a similar model to the Siata Formichetta known as the Furgoneta Costa of which 2,500 units were manufactured.) Other derivatives developed by Siata Española were:

- Siata Ampurias. A three-box saloon version with two suicide doors of which twenty-four units were manufactured in 1960.
- Siata Patricia. A one-box nine-seater door-less beach version, with the passengers in the second and third row facing each other, of which six units were manufactured on demand with a price of 159,300 pesetas (€957,41) each.
- Siata Tarraco. A three-box sporty saloon version with two conventional doors of which 598 units were manufactured in 1960–1971.
- Siata Turisa. A three-box two-seater sporty convertible roadster version with two conventional doors of which 228 units were manufactured in 1960–1962.
- Siata Minivan. A compact van with cargo, passenger and mixed versions of which 8,000 units were manufactured in 1967–1972. In 1972, Motor Ibérica took over the manufacturing of the van, which continued until 1980, replacing different components with those of newer SEAT cars. Counting all versions and updates, and all the names under which it was marketed, approximately 22,700 units were manufactured.

Manufacturas Railly (MARSA), a carbody maker from Barcelona, developed the SEAT 600 Multiple, the version with SEAT parts of the Fiat 600 Multipla, a four-door six-seater MPV, but only about twenty units were sold between 1960 and 1962.

Sporty versions of the SEAT 600 prepared for automobile competition were also developed. The most common ones were prepared by Abarth, but cars were also modified by Conti, Autolinea, and Zakspeed, and were equipped with SEAT 850 or SEAT 1430 engines, tuned up to 110 bhp (82 kW) capable of reaching 200 km/h (120 mph), also modifying other components such as brakes or wheels. They had taken part in several competition events, driven by pilots such as Antonio Zanini.

== Technical specifications ==
The SEAT 600 is a license-built Fiat 600. It has a rear-engined/rear wheel-drive layout and is technically very basic. The engine is an inline-four, water-cooled unit originally with a displacement of 633 cc (39 cu in) producing 21.5 hp (16 kW) and later 767 cc (47 cu in), yielding 32.5 hp (24 kW) at 4600 rpm. It has hydraulic drum brakes on all four wheels and three-synchro (no synchro on first) four-speed manual transaxle with reverse gear. It uses 5.20 R12 tyres –12 in × 5.2 in (300 mm × 130 mm)–.

Model	Body style	Displacement (cc, cu in)	Power	Top speed	Weight	Years
600	Two-door (suicide)	633 cc (39 cu in)	21.5 hp (16 kW)	95 km/h (59 mph)	590 kg (1,300 lb)	1957–1961
600	Two-door (suicide)	633 cc (39 cu in)	24.5 hp (18 kW)	105 km/h (65 mph)	590 kg (1,300 lb)	1961–1963
600 D	Two-door (suicide)	767 cc (47 cu in)	29.5 hp (22 kW)	108 km/h (67 mph)	605 kg (1,334 lb)	1963–1970
600 E	Two-door (conventional)	767 cc (47 cu in)	29.5 hp (22 kW)	108 km/h (67 mph)	605 kg (1,334 lb)	1969–1973
600 L	Two-door (conventional)	767 cc (47 cu in)	32.5 hp (24 kW)	115 km/h (71 mph)	615 kg (1,356 lb)	1972–1973
600 L Especial	Two-door (conventional)	767 cc (47 cu in)	32.5 hp (24 kW)	115 km/h (71 mph)	615 kg (1,356 lb)	1972–1973
800	Four-door	767 cc (47 cu in)	29.5 hp (22 kW)	108 km/h (67 mph)	635 kg (1,400 lb)	1964–1967

=== Issues ===
The biggest issue with the SEAT 600 is the engine's water cooling system, which causes regular overheating when driving at low speed and overloaded – exceeding its maximum authorized mass – something that used to be common. This is due to a radiator with little exposure to the outside air, a water pump and radiator fan driven by a weak belt, a delicate thermostat, and the common use of water as a coolant.

Neither seat belts nor side-view mirrors came as standard on any SEAT 600, which represents a safety issue. The thin and weak B-pillars did not have space or solidity to fix the robust seat belt anchors needed when stricter passive safety requirements came into force, being this one of the reasons for ending production.

== Legacy ==
The Seiscientos was also known as pelotilla (little ball), seílla or seíta (both stand for little SEAT), and ombligo (navel) – because "everyone" had one.

Being such a popular vehicle, it appears extensively in the Spanish cinema of the time, even becoming the center of the plot as in the film Ya tenemos coche (1958), directed by Julio Salvador, in which a family struggles to buy a Seiscientos. It is also widely used in later Spanish period films and television series depicting the era, such as in Cuéntame cómo pasó (2001–2023) in which the first car the protagonist family has is a SEAT 800. It has even appeared in the lyrics of songs, such as in the 1973 song "Adelante hombre del 600" by Moncho Alpuente.

It has several monuments built in its honor throughout Spain, as in Fuengirola (Málaga) inaugurated in 2008, Churriana de la Vega (Granada) in 2011, and Martos (Jaén) in 2014.

On 9 September 2017, as the closing event of the 60th anniversary of the first Seiscientos, SEAT organized at the Circuit de Barcelona-Catalunya in Montmeló the highest concentration of SEAT 600s ever. The Guinness World Records adjudicator confirmed that with a total of 787 SEAT 600s on parade they broke the previous world record of 344 SEATs of any model, achieved in 2016.
