= Olive Oil Commission of California =

The Olive Oil Commission of California (OOCC) was founded in 2014 by California olive oil farmers. It is an entity of the State of California which was established as a result of a bill introduced by Lois Wolk. The primary goal is to improve the sales of olive oil grown in California.

== Grades and Standards ==
The OOCC has developed its own grading and standards for olive oils from California out of its belief that the standards set by the International Olive Council were not applicable to olive oils from California. The organization collects samples of olive oils from member producers and has them tested in a laboratory in Australia for sensory and chemical analysis.

The standards have been criticized by the North American Olive Oil Association. The NAOOA claims that commission's standards fail to address product adulteration and "do not ensure authenticity or quality of the olive oil".
