= North American Olive Oil Association =

- Formation: 1989
- Type: Trade association
- Purpose: Represents producers, packagers and importers of olive oil. Performs testing of olive oils.
- Website: www.naooa.org

The North American Olive Oil Association (NAOOA) is a trade association of producers, packagers and importers of olive oil. The organization was established in 1989.

== Certification of olive oil quality ==
The North American Olive Oil Association offers a seal of quality for olive oils. The seal is available to members of the NAOOA who pay an annual licensing fee and submit their oils for testing. The oils are tested twice a year against the International Olive Council (IOC) standards and subjected to organoleptic analysis. In contrast to other testing programs, samples are not submitted by the producers, rather the samples are purchased retail to ensure that the products tested are the same as the ones purchased by consumers.

== Testing for olive oil quality ==
The NAOOA regularly collects, from the retail marketplace, random samples of olive oil which are tested to ensure compliance with standards set by the International Olive Council. Companies are notified of the results and if needed, the Food and Drug Administration is notified.

In 2013, the NAOOA sued Kangadis Food for falsely labeling Capatriti brand oil as olive oil when the product was in fact pomace oil (oil made from pits and skins of olives). The lawsuit resulted in a federal judge ordering Kangadis Foods to relabel or recall its product.

== Activities ==
The North American Olive Oil Association submitted a petition to the Food and Drug Administration for a qualified health claim for olive oil. The claim, that the monounsaturated fats in olive oil reduce the risk of coronary heart disease was approved by the FDA in 2004.

The NAOOA has challenged claims by the University of California, Davis Olive Center that most supermarket olive oils are impostors. The organization has written that Olive Center has an interest in smearing the reputations of imported olive oil because their mission is "Enhancing the quality and economic viability of California table olives and olive oil.”.

In 2014, the organization commissioned a study on National Attitudes and Usage of olive oil in the United States. The study found that only 25% of olive oil users in the USA "feel very or extremely knowledgeable about olive oil".

The organization commissioned a report in 2015 that criticizes the standards set by the Olive Oil Commission of California. The report determined that in a random testing of California olive oils, 67% of the oils failed the California standards and 28% failed standards set by the International Olive Council.

The NAOOA has been active in New York, Connecticut, Oregon and California's adoption of the international standards for olive oil grading and quality.
