= Extra Virginity =

2011 nonfiction book

Extra Virginity: The Sublime and Scandalous World of Olive Oil
- Author: Tom Mueller
- Language: English
- Subject: Olive oil
- Publisher: W.W. Norton & Company
- Publication date: 2011
- Publication place: United States
- Media type: Print
- Pages: 238
- ISBN: 0393070212
- OCLC: 780954413
- Dewey Decimal: 664.362
- LC Class: TP683 .M84 2011

Extra Virginity: The Sublime and Scandalous World of Olive Oil is a 2011 nonfiction book by American author Tom Mueller about olive oil. The book describes the history of olive oil, including its religious, economic, and culinary uses, as well as the current state of the olive oil industry. Extra Virginity asserts that the global olive oil industry is rife with corruption and fraud due to lax governmental regulations, but it also presents stories of individuals, including growers and government officials, who seek to curb such practices and promote genuine extra virgin olive oil. The book also includes an appendix with advice to consumers for choosing good oil. Extra Virginity expands upon "Slippery Business", an article Mueller wrote for The New Yorker in 2007 which described the state of the Italian olive oil industry.

== Content ==
The book opens with a panel taste test of various olive oils being conducted by the Mastri Oleari corporation, a private olive oil association in Milan, introducing the sixteen defects officially identified by the International Olive Council as preventing an oil from being labeled as "extra virgin". Subsequent sections of the book explain how such defective oil is often chemically altered and repackaged as extra virgin.

Extra Virginity gives an overview of the importance of olive oil in classical antiquity, such as its use in cosmetics, bathing, and lubrication. Mueller describes an archaeological site on Cyprus, where an olive oil press stood in the middle of an ancient industrial complex. He reports that archaeologists speculate that the oil would have been used throughout the complex in various processes, such as perfume making and weaving; one archaeologist says that olive oil was as important to the ancient world as petroleum is to the modern world. Mueller also visits Monte Testaccio in Rome, an artificial mound full of amphorae debris bearing tituli picti, an ancient form of labeling indicating an olive oil's origin, quality, and the identities of the merchants who processed and shipped it.

Mueller's overview of the modern olive oil industry includes a visit to a Bertolli plant in Inveruno; independent growers in Apulia, Cyprus, and California; and the monastery of New Norcia, Western Australia, founded by Spanish monks, which also produces olive oil. While the book is critical of many international olive oil companies, lax government regulation, and non-governmental organizations such as the International Olive Council, Mueller expresses optimism that increased olive oil consumption in such places as Australia and the United States will drive a resurgence of true extra virgin olive oil analogous to the rise of microbrewing and fine wine.

== Website ==
Along with writing Extra Virginity, Mueller created a website, extravirginity.com, to promote the book and its ideas. The website was later renamed Truth in Olive Oil and relocated to truthinoliveoil.com; as of 2026, the URL redirects to his main website. The site had content such as news and olive oil buyers' guides.

== Reception ==
Extra Virginity received mixed reviews. Writing for The New York Times, Dwight Garner was critical of some Extra Virginity's flowery language, calling it "an unintentional master class in how to say waxy and embalming things about fresh food" and contrasting it with the "cogent" New Yorker article it grew from. The reviewer appreciated the book's informativeness, however. Mueller responded to this review in The Huffington Post, suggesting its criticisms stemmed from a misreading of the book. An opinion piece in The Olive Oil Times previously raised some of the same issues with the review. Bloomberg Businessweek gave the book two and a half stars out of five, comparing it to Mark Kurlansky's books on the history of cod and salt, as well as Eric Schlosser's Fast Food Nation. The review described the book as "undernourished", suggesting the subject matter could have prompted a much larger book.

More positive reviews of Extra Virginity include those of the Los Angeles Times, praising Mueller's investigative talents, and Kirkus Reviews, saying, "Engrossing history, vivid contemporary reporting and a cogent call to action, expertly blended in an illuminating text."

== See also ==
- Olive oil regulation and adulteration
