= Moncho Alpuente =

Spanish journalist, writer and musician (1949–2015)

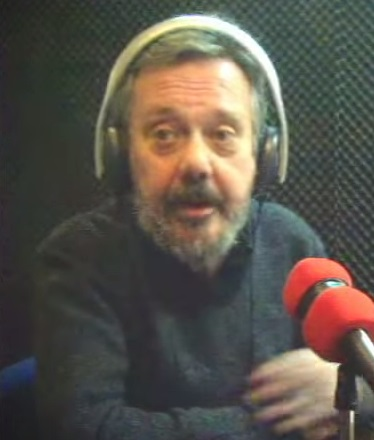
- Moncho Alpuente en 2011
- Born: 23 May 1949; Madrid
- Died: 21 March 2015 (aged 65); Las Palmas
- Occupation: Journalist, writer and musician

Ramón Mas Alpuente (1949–2015), best known as Moncho Alpuente, was a Spanish journalist, writer and musician.

Born on 23 May 1949 in Madrid, he studied journalism.

A noted figure of the Movida madrileña, he performed in several musical bands including Las Madres del Cordero, Desde Santurce a Bilbao Blues Band, Moncho Alpuente y Los Kwai and The Moncho Alpuente Experience.

One of the founders of Popular FM back in 1971, he had a long career in radio. A regular collaborator for El País and also Público in his later years, he stood out as unofficial chronicler of the city of Madrid, to which he dedicated hundreds of pieces at the local section of El País.

He died in Las Palmas de Gran Canaria on 21 March 2015.

== Books ==
- Solo para fumadores. 1988.
- Hablando francamente. 1990.
- Versos perversos. 2000.
- Grandezas de España: la historia más grande jamás contada con menos escrúpulos. 2000.

== Television ==
On television he began with the musical program Mundo Pop (1974) on Spanish Television, in which he was a director, presenter and scriptwriter. In subsequent years, he contributed regularly different spaces:

- Tele-Magazine (1974-1975)
- Popgrama (1979-1980)
- What a night that year! (1987)
- Delusions of love (1989)
- The worst show of the week (1993)
- The commons (1999)
- Wyoming Rooftop (2005)
