= Šalov =

Šalov Garamsalló
- Municipality
- Flag

- Location of Šalov in the Nitra Region Location of Šalov in Slovakia
- Coordinates: 48.00°N 18.72°E
- Country: Slovakia
- Region: Nitra Region
- District: Levice District
- First mentioned: 1280

Area
  - Total: 19.04 km^{2} (7.35 sq mi)
- Elevation: 157 m (515 ft)

Population (2025)
  - Total: 361
- Time zone: UTC+1 (CET)
  - Summer (DST): UTC+2 (CEST)
- Postal code: 935 71
- Area code: +421 36
- Vehicle registration plate (until 2022): LV
- Website: www.salov.sk

Šalov (Hungarian: Garamsalló) is a village and municipality in the Levice District in the Nitra Region of Slovakia.

== History ==
In historical records the village was first mentioned in 1280.

== Geography ==
The municipality lies at an altitude of 157 metres (515 ft) and covers an area of 19.04 km^{2} (7.35 sq mi) (2025).

== Population ==
Population statistic (10 years)
Year	1995	2005	2015	2025
Count	409	428	373	361
Difference		+4.64%	−12.85%	−3.21%

Population statistic
Year	2024	2025
Count	359	361
Difference		+0.55%

It has a population of 361 people (31 December 2025).

=== Ethnicity ===
Census 2021 (1+ %)
Ethnicity	Number	Fraction
Hungarian	211	59.94%
Slovak	111	31.53%
Romani	62	17.61%
Not found out	44	12.5%
Total	352	

In year 2021 was 352 people by ethnicity 211 as Hungarian, 111 as Slovak, 62 as Romani, 44 as Not found out and 1 as Czech.

Note on population: The difference values of population numbers in the table "Population statistic" and in the sections "Ethnicity" & "Religion" is caused by the use of various statistical methods.

=== Religion ===
Census 2021 (1+ %)
Religion	Number	Fraction
Roman Catholic Church	183	51.99%
None	56	15.91%
Calvinist Church	52	14.77%
Not found out	41	11.65%
Evangelical Church	9	2.56%
Greek Catholic Church	4	1.14%
Total	352	

In year 2021 was 352 people by religion 183 from Roman Catholic Church, 56 from None, 52 from Calvinist Church, 41 from Not found out, 9 from Evangelical Church, 4 from Greek Catholic Church, 2 from Christian Congregations in Slovakia, 1 from Eastern Orthodox Church, 1 from New Apostolic Church, 1 from Buddhism, 1 from Bahá'i Community and 1 from Apostolic Church.

== Facilities ==
The village has a public library and football pitch.
