= European Union food quality scandal =

Food inequality scandal

The European Union food quality scandal is a controversy claiming that certain food brands and items targeted at Central and Eastern European Union countries' markets are of lower quality than their exact equivalents produced for the Western European Union markets.

European Commission President Jean-Claude Juncker acknowledged the issue in his State of the Union address pledging funding to help national food authorities test the inferior products and start to tackle the food inequality. In April 2018 EU Justice and Consumers Commissioner Věra Jourová stated that "We will step up the fight against dual food quality. We have amended the Unfair Commercial Practice Directive to make it black and white that dual food quality is forbidden."
