= Salov (surname) =

Salov or Šalov is a Slavic male surname, its feminine counterpart is Salova or Šalova. It may refer to

- Igor Salov (born 1983), Russian rower
- Ilya Salov (1834-1902), Russian writer
- Nenad Šalov (born 1955), Croatian football midfielder
- Serhiy Salov (born 1979), Canadian pianist of Ukrainian origin
- Valery Salov (born 1964), Russian chess grandmaster
