= Manzanares de Rioja =

- Municipality
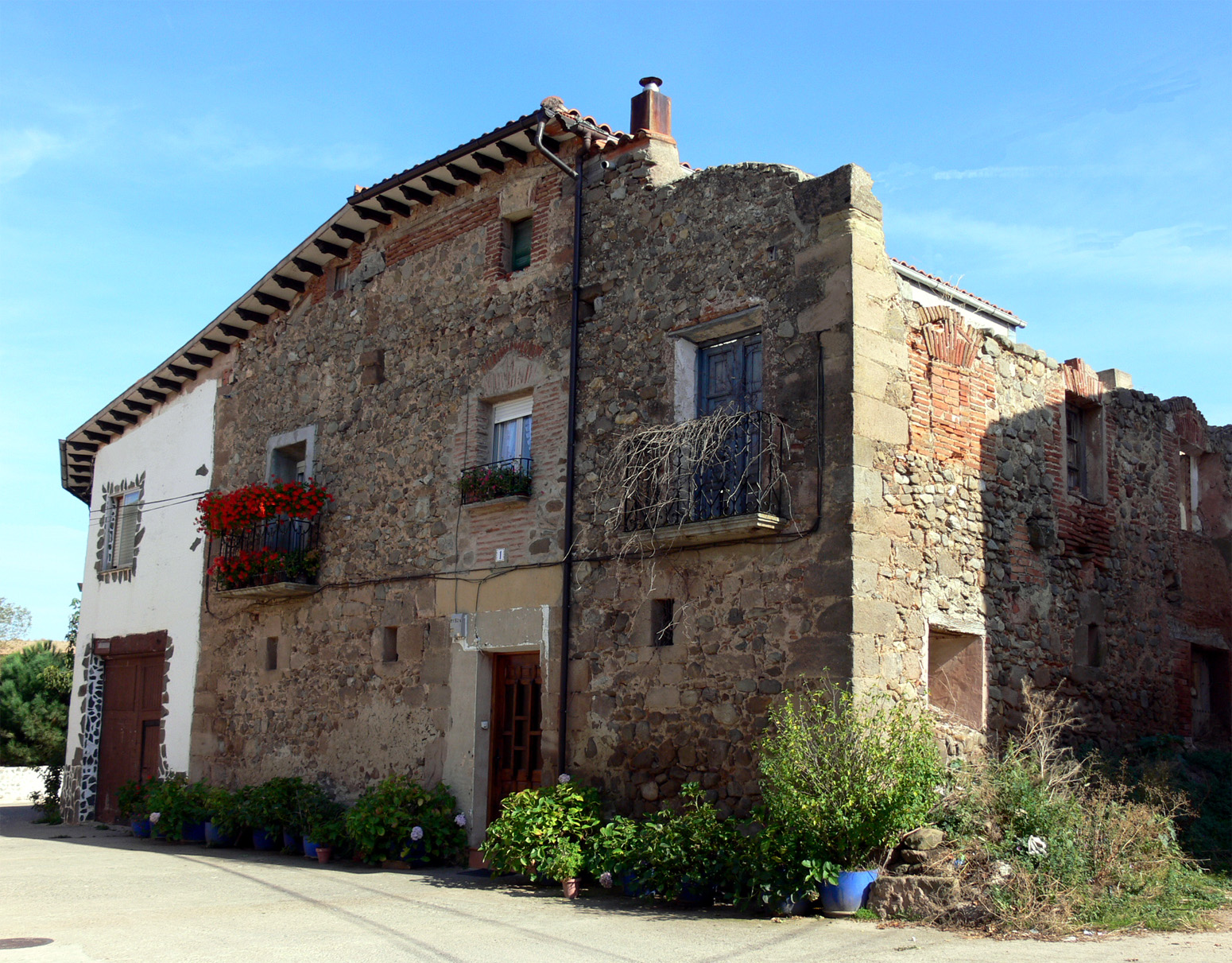
- Typical houses

- Location within La Rioja, Spain Location within Spain
- Coordinates: 42°23′46″N 2°53′42″W
- Country: Spain
- Autonomous community: La Rioja
- Comarca: Santo Domingo de la Calzada

Government
  - Mayor: Anastasio Jesús Martínez Metola (PP)

Area
  - Total: 17.91 km^{2} (6.92 sq mi)
- Elevation: 806 m (2,644 ft)

Population (2025-01-01)
  - Total: 68
- Postal code: 26258

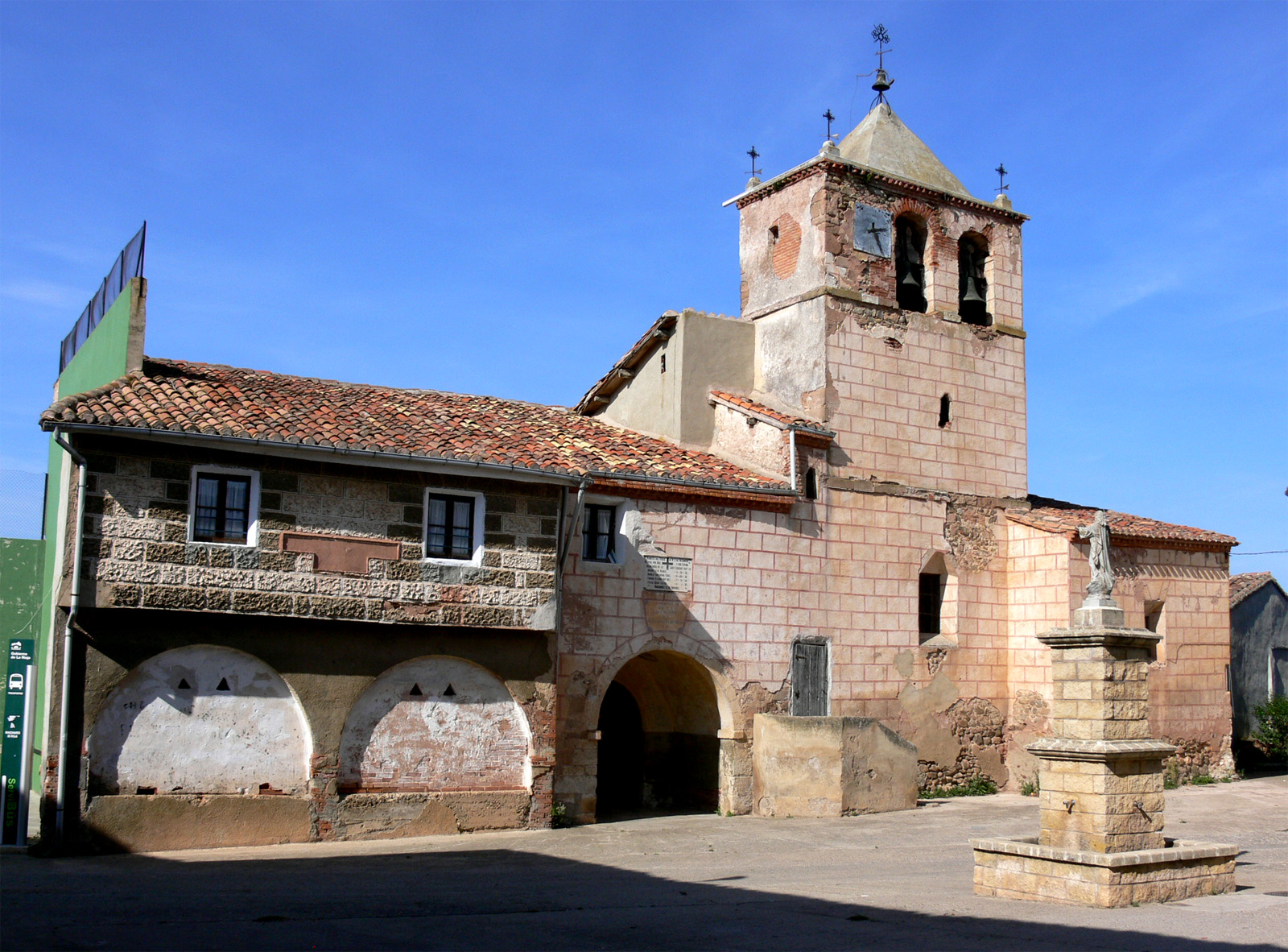
Church of the Assumption

Manzanares de Rioja is a village in the province and autonomous community of La Rioja, Spain. The municipality covers an area of 17.91 square kilometres (6.92 sq mi) and as of 2011 had a population of 101 people.
