= International Olive Council =

Intergovernmental organization

Coordinates: 40°26′53″N 3°40′40″W

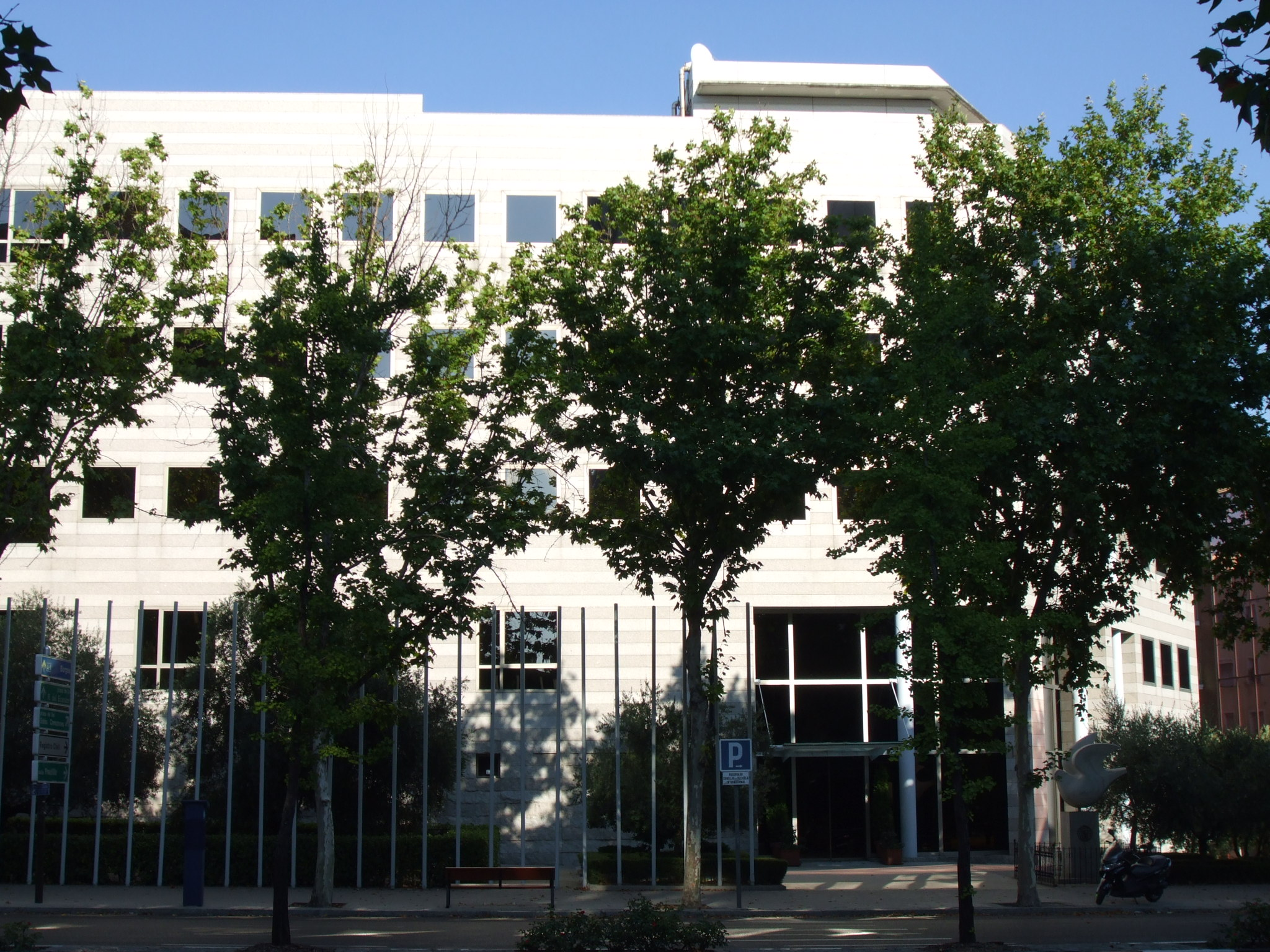
Headquarters, Madrid

The International Olive Council (IOC), formerly the International Olive Oil Council (IOOC), is an intergovernmental organization of states that produce olives or products derived from olives, such as olive oil.

The organization's members account for more than 94% of global olive production.

The IOC's headquarters are in Madrid, Spain.

== History ==
The IOOC had its genesis in the International Agreement on Olive Oil, which was concluded in Geneva on 17 October 1955. After this treaty was amended and the amended version came into force, the IOOC was established under this treaty in 1959, with headquarters in Madrid. This first agreement remained in force until 1963, when a second agreement was negotiated. The organisation was governed by the following agreements during the time spans indicated:

- 1956 International Olive Oil Agreement (amended 1955 Agreement) (1956–1963);
- 1963 International Olive Oil Agreement (1963–1979);
- 1979 International Olive Oil Agreement (1979–1986);
- 1986 International Agreement on Olive Oil and Table Olives (1986–2005);
- 2005 International Agreement on Olive Oil and Table Olives (2005–2015);
- 2015 International Agreement on Olive Oil and Table Olives (2015–).

In 2006, the International Olive Oil Council changed its name to the International Olive Council to recognise that the Council also deals with table olives. This had been recognised since the Council's 1986 agreement.

A new agreement was negotiated and concluded in October 2015 and was open for signature throughout 2016.

- 2016 Decision No Dec-18/S.Ex. 27-V/2016 Revising the Trade Standard applying To Olive Oils and Olive Pomace Oils

== Member states ==
The IOC currently has 21 state members including the European Union. These states account for over 94 per cent of the world's olive production. The following states of the IOC are below (the year of the state's first ratification of one of the Agreements is included; an asterisk indicates that the state was a founding member of the IOOC):

- European Union*
- Libya* (1956)
- Tunisia* (1956)
- Morocco (1958)
- Israel* (1958)
- Algeria (1963)
- Egypt (1964)
- Lebanon (1973)
- Jordan (2002)
- Iran (2004)
- Montenegro (2007)
- Albania (2009)
- Argentina (2009)
- Turkey (2010)
- Uruguay (2013)
- Palestine (2017)
- Georgia (2019)
- Saudi Arabia (2023)
- Uzbekistan (2021)
- Bosnia and Herzegovina (2024)
- Azerbaijan (2024)
- Pakistan (2026)

=== Membership requirements ===
Because the IOC is an international, intergovernmental organisation, membership is only open to the governments of states and to international organisations with responsibilities in the negotiation, conclusion and application of international agreements, especially commodity agreements. Private companies or individuals cannot join the IOC.

If a country is interested in joining, its government submits an application to the Council of Members, usually through its Ministry of Foreign Affairs or another ministry, or through its embassy in Spain. The Council of Members examines the application and determines the conditions of accession of the applicant country. This includes fixing the number of participation shares in the IOC budget and setting a time limit for the country to file its instrument of accession with the depository of the Agreement. As soon as the applicant deposits its instrument it becomes a Member.

== Observers ==
Three categories of observer are allowed to attend all or part of IOC sessions, provided they have the prior consent of the Council of Members.

- International organisations and institutions. This includes the United Nations and its organs, in particular the United Nations Conference on Trade and Development (UNCTAD), the United Nations Development Programme (UNDP), the World Health Organization (WHO), the Food and Agriculture Organization of the United Nations (FAO), the Joint FAO/WHO Programme of the Codex Alimentarius Commission, the International Labour Organization (ILO), the United Nations Educational, Scientific and Cultural Organization (UNESCO) and other specialised UN agencies.
- Intergovernmental, governmental and non-governmental organisations that could provide funding for IOC activities.
- The government of any member or observer State of the United Nations or of one of the organisations mentioned in the first bullet that envisages joining the Agreement.

== Headquarters ==
The IOC has been headquartered in Madrid since it was founded in 1959. The rights, immunities and privileges of the IOC headquarters, staff and representatives are stipulated in a Headquarters Agreement signed with the Kingdom of Spain, which is the host country of the Organisation.

== Official languages ==
The IOC has five official languages (Arabic, English, French, Italian and Spanish) and two working languages (English and French).

== Funding ==
The IOC is funded through compulsory contributions paid by its Member States. Contributions are calculated each year according to the number of participation shares awarded to each Member in the IOC budget.

== Structure ==
The structure of the IOC revolves around the key figures of the Council of Members and its committees, the IOC chair, and the Executive Secretariat.

=== Council of Members ===
The Council of Members is the principal decision-making body of the IOC. It is made up of one delegate per Member, who is assisted by alternates and advisers. It meets at least once a year to review IOC work and to approve the action programme and budget for the next year. The Council of Members takes decisions by consensus. If consensus is not reached, decision making is done by a qualified majority.

=== Committees ===
The committees discuss and lay the groundwork for proposals and three-year action plans which are then submitted to the Council of Members. The IOC has five committees:

- Promotion and Economic Affairs Committee: Ongoing and future promotional activities and campaigns to promote olive oil and table olive consumption are examined by this committee, which marks out the direction of IOC promotional policy. This committee discusses and approves also the statistics compiled by the Executive Secretariat on production, consumption, imports, exports and stocks of olive oils and table olives. It keeps track of market developments and national policymaking in the olive sector and makes proposals to achieve balanced supply and demand.
- Technical Committee: The brief of this committee is to review and discuss the programmes and activities proposed by the Executive Secretariat in the areas of olive oil chemistry and standardisation, research and development, technology transfer, training and customised technical assistance for the member countries.
- Standardisation and Chemistry Committee: This Committee seeks the uniformity between national and international legislation relating to the physico-chemical and organoleptic characteristics of olive oils, olive pomace oils and table olives and updates and validates new methods of analysis.
- Administrative and Financial Affairs Committee: This committee supervises all administrative affairs, human resources issues and makes the financial control of the IOC. It examines the IOC financial statements and yearly audit and analyses the draft budgets proposed by the Executive Secretariat. It is also responsible for developing and updating all IOC financial procedures.
- Advisory Committee on Olive Oil and Table Olives: This committee is a fundamental talking partner for the Council of Members. Its representatives are drawn from all the branches of the olive sector in the member countries: producers, processors, marketers and consumers. It was established to voice the opinions of business circles and to help the Executive Secretariat to find effective solutions to any issues.

=== IOC Chair ===
The Council of Members elects a chairperson who serves a one-year term of office, which is rotated among the IOC Members. The chairperson plays a vital part in the life of the Organisation and carries out many duties, most importantly presiding over meetings and sessions and representing the IOC legally. A vice-chair is also elected each year and succeeds to the chair the following year. Since January 2025, the IOC is chaired by Libya, represented by Walid B. D. Abuabdalla, Ambassador of Libya to Spain. https://www.internationaloliveoil.org/structure-2/

=== Executive Secretariat ===
The IOC is served by a Secretariat headed by an Executive Director, who is assisted by senior officials and other staff. The Executive Secretariat is the operative arm of the IOC, implementing its decisions and strategy and serving the needs of its Members. It is made up of five Units: Promotion and Economic Affairs Unit, Technical Unit, Chemistry & Standardisation Unit, Administrative Affairs & HR Unit and Financial Management Unit.

- Administrative Management and Human Resources Unit: attends to administrative, logistic and staff affairs.
- Standardisation and Research Unit: develops and harmonises standards and methods of physico–chemical and sensory analysis for olive oils and table olives in addition to industry management guides; collaborates with the Codex Alimentarius Commission and other standards-related bodies; oversees an annual proficiency programme for chemical and sensory testing laboratories wishing to obtain IOC recognition; organises the annual IOC Mario Solinas Quality Award aimed at showcasing excellence in extra virgin olive oils and other institutional IOC-supported national competitions; coordinates an olive oil quality control programme in import markets; recognises and coordinates training activities for chemical laboratories and sensory panels working on olive oils and table olives; coordinates research activities in relevant areas of study.
- Economy and Promotion Unit: compiles and releases economic data and world statistics on olive oils and table olives, coordinates Economic and Advisory Committee meetings and working groups and conducts international surveys and economic research. It also coordinates promotional campaigns, runs a grant-funding programme for promotional activities, prepares information material, participates in promotional events and produces OLIVAE, the official scientific journal of the IOC.
- Financial Management Unit: responsible for budgetary and financial aspects.
- Olive growing, Olive Oil Technology and Environment Unit: encourages research and development and promotes the dissemination of technology and training to modernise olive growing and the olive products industry, improve product quality, protect the environment and reduce costs; carries out R&D projects; organises courses and seminars; publishes practical guides and manuals; holds training initiatives and runs a grant-funding scheme for extension and technical assistance activities.

== IOC trade standards ==
Some very important aspects of the IOC work is to promote consumer confidence, stimulate international trade and to prevent fraud. The IOC has two trade standards:

- for liquid olive oils and olive pomace oils
- for edible fruit (called table olives) and derivative products.

=== International cooperation ===
Part of the remit of the IOC is to ensure compliance with the latest food technology standards by working very closely with leading chemists from its member countries who contribute their knowledge and expertise.

It also cooperates with other international organisations such as the International Organization for Standardization (ISO) or the Codex Alimentarius Commission in order to ensure their testing methods and standards remain updated and compatible or comparable with the standards of other relevant agencies.

=== Standard naming practice for oils and table olives ===
To avoid confusion IOC Members are committed to prohibiting the use of any product names other than those explicitly specified in the IOC standard.

The olive oil standard fixes the names and definitions of the different categories of olive oils and olive pomace oils as well the quality and purity criteria for each grade of product.

The table olive standard fixes the names, definitions and requirements for all the common varieties, the pickling or preservative methods as well as trade preparations of table olives such as pastes and decorative presentations.

=== Quality assurance ===
The IOC specifies acceptable quality control testing methods as well as specifying other consumer transparency information, for example: hygiene standards along the supply chain, suitable packing materials and filling tolerances product labelling standards, identification of any food additives or allowable contaminants, recommendations for environmental protection in the use and disposal of olive products etc. .

== Classification of olive oils and olive pomace oils ==
The different categories of olive oils and olive pomace oils are named and defined in the International Agreement and the IOC trade standard.

=== Olive oil ===
Olive oil is oil obtained solely from the fruit of the olive tree (Olea europaea L.) which has been extracted mechanically. Oils obtained using solvents or re-esterification processes are excluded as are any mixture with oils of other kinds. Olive oil may be either edible or industrial and is marketed in accordance with the following designations and definitions:

Virgin olive oil is obtained from the fruit of the olive tree solely by mechanical or other physical means under conditions – particularly thermal conditions – that do not lead to alterations in the oil, and which have not undergone any treatment other than washing, decantation, centrifugation and filtration.

Virgin olive oils fit for consumption as they are include:

1. Extra virgin olive oil: virgin olive oil which has a free acidity (expressed in oleic acid equivalents), of not more than 0.8 grams per 100 grams, and the other characteristics of which correspond to those fixed for this category in the IOC standard.
2. Virgin olive oil: virgin olive oil which has a free acidity of not more than 2 grams per 100 grams and the other characteristics of which correspond to those fixed for this category in the IOC standard
3. Ordinary virgin olive oil: virgin olive oil which has a free acidity of not more than 3.3 grams per 100 grams and the other characteristics of which correspond to those fixed for this category in the IOC standard. (Note: This designation may only be sold direct to the consumer if permitted in the country of retail sale. If not permitted, the designation of this product shall comply with the legal provisions of the country concerned.)

Lampante virgin olive oil has a free acidity of more than 3.3 grams per 100 grams and/or the organoleptic characteristics and other characteristics of which correspond to those fixed for this category in the IOC standard. They are not suitable for human consumption and are therefore usually refined.

Refined olive oil is obtained from virgin olive oils by refining methods which do not lead to alterations in the initial glyceridic structure. It has a free acidity of not more than 0.3 grams per 100 grams and its other characteristics correspond to those fixed for this category in the IOC standard. (Note: This designation may only be sold direct to the consumer if permitted in the country of retail sale.)

Olive oil consists of a blend of refined olive oil and virgin olive oils fit for consumption as they are. It has a free acidity of not more than 1 gram per 100 grams and its other characteristics correspond to those fixed for this category in the IOC standard. (Note: The country of retail sale may require a more specific designation.)

=== Olive pomace oil ===
Olive pomace oil is obtained by treating olive pomace with solvents or other physical treatments, to the exclusion of oils obtained by re-esterification processes and of any mixture with oils of other kinds. It is marketed in accordance with the following designations and definitions:

1. Crude olive pomace oil is olive pomace oil whose characteristics correspond to those fixed for this category in the IOC standard. It is intended for refining for use for human consumption, or for technical use.
2. Refined olive pomace oil is obtained from crude olive pomace oil by refining methods which do not lead to alterations in the initial glyceridic structure. It has a free acidity, expressed as oleic acid, of not more than 0.3 grams per 100 grams and its other characteristics correspond to those fixed for this category in the IOC standard (Note: This product may only be sold direct to the consumer if permitted in the country of retail sale.)
3. Olive pomace oil is a blend of refined olive pomace oil and virgin olive oils fit for consumption as they are. It has a free acidity of not more than 1 gram per 100 grams and its other characteristics correspond to those fixed for this category in the IOC standard. (Note: The country of retail sale may require a more specific designation) In no case shall this blend be called olive oil.

== IOC Mario Solinas Quality Award ==
The IOC Mario Solinas Quality Award was launched in the year 2000 to reward producers, producer associations and packers for excellence and craftsmanship in the production of extra virgin olive oils. A twin aim is to increase consumer awareness and visibility of the wide range of sensory attributes of the superior extra virgin olive oils found on the marketplace.

Entries are classified in different categories according to their fruitiness and evaluated by IOC-recognised panels which use a 100-point profile sheet to rate their smell, taste, retronasal sensations, harmony, complexity and persistence.

The highest scorers are then assessed by an international panel of judges who pick the first, second and third prize winners in each section of the competition. Winners receive a medal and a diploma. They are also allowed to mention their Award on bottles of extra virgin olive oil belonging to the same batch as the prize winner.

== Controversies ==
The IOC has for long been seen as an independent organism to regulate and promote the sector of olive products, particularly olive oil. However in the early 2000s some controversies became public. In 2002, the European Commission raised issues with Fausto Luchetti, an Italian who held the position of Executive Director of the IOC between 1987 and 2002, in relation to allegations of irregularities in the management of the organization's funds. This quickly forced Luchetti's resignation; he was prosecuted under Spanish national law, rather than at an international tribunal as per Spanish regulations related to international organisations. The issue was only resolved 13 years later, with Luchetti's complete acquittal; he claimed that the case was made against him to attack the olive oil sector in favor of other vegetable fat products; he claimed that the lobbies of the oilseeds industries were unhappy about the IOC's good results.

During recent years, it has become more and more evident that the major olive oil producing country, Spain, is opposing the second largest world's producer, Italy, to weaken some of the quality parameters in order to foster marketing of lower grades olive oils worldwide. Italy's focus on quality constantly raised conflict in political and technical debates within the IOC and EU. In 2018 and 2019, the efforts of the Spanish industry to attack and belittle the organoleptic method (so-called "panel test") raised Italy's attention. In a meeting hold at the IOC in May 2019, Italy's protests avoided a change that would have diminished the legal value of the organoleptic assessment for public control in the import/export.

In 2016, public protests against the election of a Spanish deputy director were raised by Italy, as it was in contrast with the political agreement made to balance the direction of the agricultural sector within the European Union. These protests became even stronger in summer 2019, when the vote to re-elect for other 4 years the Tunisian Executive Director Abdelladif Ghedira and deputy directors, including the Spanish Jaime Lillo, took place in June 2019 in Mararkesh. Italy protested at the European Union level and the Italian industry protested on the media about the re-election of the Tunisian and Spanish directors who had already led the IOC for 4 years. This caused the abstention of the EU as an IOC member. Shortly after his re-election, Ghedira also dismissed an Italian technician who had a pivotal position in the organization. This move also upset Italian officials and sparked controversy among operators in the sector. According to Italian media reports, several others also criticized some of the issues that emerged during and after the session. The re-election of the same executive of the so-called "Tunisia-Spain axis" raised public protests within the Italian sector, as it was seen as the "death of olive oil quality" , and that Italy was "expelled" from the IOC in favor of the Tunisian-Spanish management, defined as the "lords of olive oil". An international case was raised by Israel - an IOC member - who claimed that his representative was not allowed to enter in the room for the discussion and therefore they did not recognize the election of the directors. This was the first case in the IOC history in which a member was not allowed to vote. Italian and American newspapers also released the information that a few days after their re-election, the Tunisian and Spanish directors dismissed an Italian technician who had a pivotal position in the organization. This move also upset Italian officials and sparked controversy among operators in the sector, worried that the plan of the newly elected directors was to avoid improvement of the olive oil quality but only fostering their efforts for Spain and Tunisia
