= Mora =

Mora may refer to:

== People ==
- Mora coat of arms, used by several Polish szlachta families
- José Maria Mora (1847–1926), Cuban-American photographer, often credited as "Mora"
- Lola Mora (1866–1936), Argentine sculptor known as "Mora" in the artistic scene
- Mora (singer) (born 1996), a Puerto Rican singer
- Mora (surname), a Spanish name (includes a list of people with the name)

== Places ==
=== Sweden ===
- Mora, Säter, Sweden
- Mora, Sweden, the seat of Mora Municipality
- Mora Municipality, Sweden

=== United States ===
- Mora, Louisiana, an unincorporated community
- Mora, Minnesota, a city
- Mora, Missouri, an unincorporated community
- Mora County, New Mexico
  - Mora, New Mexico, a census-designated place and the county seat
  - Mora River, partially in Mora County

=== Elsewhere ===
- Mora, Cordillera, Bolivia
- Mora, Cameroon, a town
- Mora (canton), San José, Costa Rica
- Mora, Cyprus, a village
- Mõra, Estonia, a village
- Mora, Maharashtra, India, a port serving the town of Uran
- Mora, Portugal, a municipality
- Mora, Spain, a town and municipality in the province of Toledo
- Mora de Rubielos, a town in Aragón, Spain
- Morea Eyalet (Ottoman Turkish: Eyālet-i Mōrâ), a former Ottoman Empire province in what is now Greece
- Mora (historical region), East Africa
- 1257 Móra, an asteroid

== Sports ==
- Mora CF, a Spanish football team
- Mora IK, an ice hockey club in Mora, Sweden
- IFK Mora, a sports club in Mora, Sweden
- IFK Mora Fotboll, a football club in Mora, Sweden

== Warfare ==
- Mora (military unit), an ancient Spartan unit of about 600 soldiers
- First Battle of Mora, an 1847 battle of the Mexican–American War
- Second Battle of Mora, an 1847 battle of the Mexican–American War

== Other uses ==
- Mora (album), a 2011 album by Hungarian industrial nu metal band FreshFabrik
- MORA (aviation), minimum off-route altitude
- Mora (fish), a genus of fish in the family Moridae
- Mora (plant), a genus of plants in the pea family Fabaceae
- Mora (linguistics), a unit of sound
  - mōra, the modern Japanese equivalent
- Mora (music store), a music download store by Sony
- Mora Banc Grup, joint name of two Andorran banks
- Mora (mythology), in Slavic mythology
- Mora (ship), the flagship of William the Conqueror
- Mora station, Busan, South Korea, a railway station
- Mora clock, a type of 19th-century Swedish longcase clock
- Mora knife, a type of knife made by various makers in Mora, Sweden
- Cyclone Mora, a tropical cyclone that affected Bangladesh in 2017

== See also ==
- Siege of Mora, in World War I
- Mora v. McNamara, a 1967 US Supreme Court case
- Stones of Mora, the place where Swedish kings were elected
- De la Mora (disambiguation)
- Morea (disambiguation)
- Moria (disambiguation)
- Morra (disambiguation)
- Mayura (disambiguation)
- Moras, a commune in France
