= Moriah (disambiguation) =

Moriah is the name given to a mountainous region in the Book of Genesis.

Moriah may also refer to:

== Places ==
=== Australia ===
- Moriah College, in Sydney

=== Bahamas ===
- Mount Moriah (Bahamas Parliament constituency)

=== Canada ===
- Mount Moriah, Newfoundland and Labrador

=== United Kingdom ===
- Moriah, Ceredigion, Wales
- Moriah, an electoral ward of Caerphilly County Borough Council
- Moriah Chapel, Loughor, associated with minister Evan Roberts and the 1904-1905 revival

=== United States ===
- Moriah, New York
  - Moriah Shock Incarceration Correctional Facility
- Mount Moriah, Missouri
- Mount Moriah (Nevada), a mountain
  - Mount Moriah Wilderness
- Carter-Moriah Range, in the White Mountains of New Hampshire
  - Mount Moriah (New Hampshire)
  - Middle Moriah Mountain
  - Shelburne Moriah Mountain
- Mount Moriah, Philadelphia, Pennsylvania, a neighborhood
  - Mount Moriah station
  - Mount Moriah Cemetery (Philadelphia)
- Mount Moriah Cemetery (South Dakota), burial place of several Wild West figures in Deadwood
- Mount Moriah Cemetery (Fairview, New Jersey)
- Moriah School, in Englewood, New Jersey

== Other uses ==
- Moriah (name), list of people with the name
- Moriah (newspaper), Hebrew newspaper in Ottoman Palestine published between 1910 and 1915
- HAT-P-23, a star also named Moriah

== See also ==
- Moira (disambiguation)
- Morea (disambiguation)
- Moria (disambiguation)
- Morya (disambiguation)
- Moriah Jerusalem Development Corporation
