= Moria =

Moria may refer to:

== Arts and entertainment ==
- Moria, Middle-earth, fictional location in the works of J. R. R. Tolkien
- Moria: The Dwarven City, a 1984 fantasy role-playing game supplement
- Moria (1978 video game), a dungeon-crawler game
- Moria (1983 video game), a computer game inspired by The Lord of the Rings
- Gecko Moria, a character in the anime/manga series One Piece

== People ==
- Blanche Moria (1859–1926), French sculptor, educator and feminist
- Steve Moria (born 1961), British-Canadian ice hockey player
- Moria Casán (born 1946), Argentine actress

== Places ==
- Mória (Μόρια), a small town in the modern municipal unit of Mytilene, Lesbos, Greece
  - Moria refugee camp near Mytilene, Lesbos
- Moria, South Africa
- Mōria, a marae in Whirinaki, Northland, New Zealand
- Moriah, the name given to a mountainous region in the Book of Genesis

== Other uses ==
- Moria people, Indigenous Muslim community of Assam
- Moria (tree) (Μορια), a type of public olive tree in ancient Greece
- Moria (nymph) (Μορια "olive tree", a nymph named in Greek mythology
- Moria, a Byzantine term for the intervals of the 72 equal temperament music scale
- Moria (political party), in Israel
- Moria, the original description of Witzelsucht, a set of rare neurological symptoms
- Moria (dinoflagellate), a genus in the family Peridiniaceae
- Moria (gastropod), a genus in the family Amnicolidae

== See also ==
- Moria people
- Moira (disambiguation)
- Morea (disambiguation)
- Moriah (disambiguation)
- Moriya (disambiguation)
- Morya (disambiguation)
- Noria (disambiguation)
- Moriae Encomium, or In Praise of Folly, a 1509 essay
