= Mayur =

Mayur may refer to:

- Mayur (given name), an Indian male given name
- Naveen Mayur, an Indian actor
- Rag Mayur, an Indian film actor
- Mayur River, in Bangladesh
- Mayur Vihar, a neighbourhood in East Delhi, India
  - Mayur Vihar Phase III, a division of the neighbourhood
  - Mayur Vihar-I metro station, a Delhi Metro station in Mayur Vihar Phase I
  - Shree Ram Mandir Mayur Vihar metro station, a Delhi Metro station in Pocket I, Mayur Vihar Phase I
  - Mayur Vihar Extension metro station, a Delhi Metro station in Extension, Mayur Vihar Phase I
  - East Vinod Nagar - Mayur Vihar-II metro station, a Delhi Metro station in Mayur Vihar Phase II

== See also ==
- Mayura (disambiguation)
- Majur (disambiguation)
