= Morra =

Morra can mean:

== People ==
- Alberto di Morra (c. 1100/1105-1187), Pope Gregory VIII
- Bernardino Morra (died 1605), Roman Catholic prelate who served as Bishop of Aversa
- Claudio Morra, (born 1995) Italian footballer
- Galal al-Morra, Egyptian Islamist politician
- Gigio Morra (1945–2024), Italian actor
- Isabella di Morra (c. 1520-1545/1546), Italian poet
- León S. Morra (1882–1948), Argentine doctor and university professor
- Mario Morra (1935–2024), Italian film editor, director and screenwriter

== Toponyms ==
- La Morra, a comune (municipality) in the Province of Cuneo, Italy
- Morra (Città di Castello), a frazione (territorial subdivision) in the Province of Perugia, Italy
- Morra, Dongeradeel, a hamlet in the province of Friesland, Netherlands
- Oued Morra, town and commune in Laghouat Province, Algeria
- Villa Morra, neighbourhood of Asunción, the capital of Paraguay

== Other ==
- Morra (game), a game similar to rock, paper, scissors
- Edward "Eddie" Morra, character protagonist of the film Limitless

== See also ==
- Mora (disambiguation)
