= Mayura =

Mayura may refer to:

- Mayura (film), a 1975 Indian Kannada language film
- Mayura (magazine), a Kannada monthly literary magazine
- Mayura (mythology), one of the sacred and highly sanctified birds of Hindu mythology
- Mayurasharma (345–365), founder of the Kadamba kingdom of Banavasi
- Mahamayuri, a Wisdom King in the Buddhist Pantheon

== Characters ==
- Mayura Daidouji, a main character in the manga The Mythical Detective Loki Ragnarok
- Mayura Ichikawa, a character in the anime Best Student Council
- Mayura Seno, a character in the manga Alice 19th
- Mayura, an antagonist in the French T.V show Miraculous: Tales of Ladybug and Cat Noir

== See also ==
- Mayur (disambiguation)
  - Mayur (given name), an Indian male given name
- Mayuri (disambiguation)
- Mor (disambiguation)
- Mora (disambiguation)
- Moriya (disambiguation)
- Morya (disambiguation)
- Mauryan Empire, an empire in ancient India
- Maurya (film), a 2004 Indian Kannada-language sports drama film
- Mayuran, a 2019 Indian drama film
- Maurya (surname), an Indian surname
- Mayurasana, a yoga posture
- Mayurakshi River or Mor River, a major river in Jharkhand and West Bengal, India
- Mayurakshi Fast Passenger, a passenger train West Bengal, India
- Mayurakshi Institute of Engineering & Technology, in Jodhpur, Rajasthan, India
- Mayurakshi, a 2017 Indian Bengali-language film by Atanu Ghosh
