= Fermentation and curing of olives =

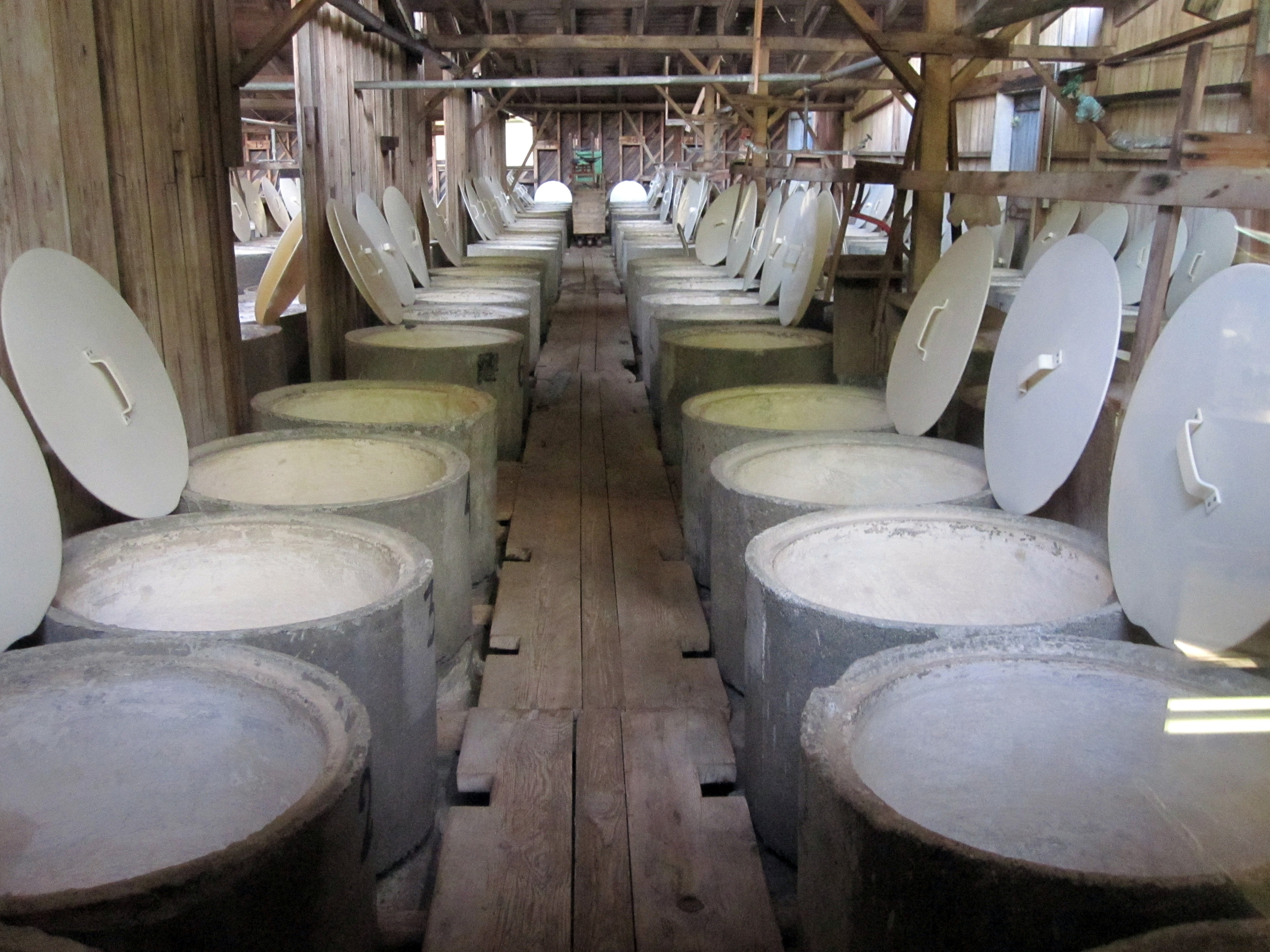
Olive curing vats at Graber Olive House, California

Raw olives are naturally very bitter and astringent; to make them palatable, they are cured and fermented using any of several processes.

== Context ==
Raw or fresh olives are naturally very bitter and astringent; to make them palatable, olives must be cured and fermented, thereby removing oleuropein, a bitter phenolic compound that can reach levels of 14% of dry matter in young olives. In addition to oleuropein, other phenolic compounds render freshly picked olives unpalatable and must be removed or lowered in quantity through curing and fermentation. Generally speaking, phenolics reach their peak in young fruit and are converted as the fruit matures. Once ripening occurs, the levels of phenolics sharply decline through their conversion to other organic products, which render some cultivars edible immediately. An edible olive native to the island of Thasos is the throubes black olive, which becomes edible when allowed to ripen in the sun, shrivel, and fall from the tree.

The curing process may take from a few days with lye, to a few months with brine or salt packing. With the exception of California style and salt-cured olives, all methods of curing involve a major fermentation involving bacteria and yeast that is of equal importance to the final table olive product. Traditional cures, using the natural microflora on the fruit to induce fermentation, lead to two important outcomes: the leaching out and breakdown of oleuropein and other unpalatable phenolic compounds, and the generation of favourable metabolites from bacteria and yeast, such as organic acids, probiotics, glycerol, and esters, which affect the taste of the final table olives. Mixed bacterial/yeast olive fermentations may have probiotic qualities. Lactic acid is the most important metabolite, as it lowers the pH, acting as a natural preservative against the growth of unwanted pathogenic species. The result is table olives which can be stored without refrigeration. Fermentations dominated by lactic acid bacteria are, therefore, the most suitable method of curing olives. Yeast-dominated fermentations produce a different suite of metabolites which provide poorer preservation, so they are corrected with an acid such as citric acid in the final processing stage to provide microbial stability.

== Fermentation types ==
Comparison of methods of preparing table olives, using lye (NaOH), brine (salted water), and other additions, usually with fermentation by lactic acid bacteria

Several types of fermentation are used to prepare table olives:

=== Spanish or Sevillian fermentation ===
Most commonly applied to green olive preparation, around 60% of all the world's table olives are produced with this method. Olives are soaked in lye (dilute NaOH, 2–4%) for 8–10 hours to hydrolyse the oleuropein. They are usually considered "treated" when the lye has penetrated two-thirds of the way into the fruit. They are then washed once or several times in water to remove the caustic solution and transferred to fermenting vessels full of brine at typical concentrations of 8–12% NaCl.

Fermentation is carried out by the natural microbiota present on the olives that survive the lye treatment process. Many organisms are involved, usually reflecting the local conditions or terroir of the olives. During a typical fermentation gram-negative enterobacteria flourish in small numbers at first but are rapidly outgrown by lactic acid bacteria species such as Leuconostoc mesenteroides, Lactiplantibacillus plantarum, Levilactobacillus brevis and Pediococcus damnosus. These bacteria produce lactic acid to help lower the pH of the brine and therefore stabilise the product against unwanted pathogenic species. A diversity of yeasts then accumulate in sufficient numbers to help complete the fermentation alongside the lactic acid bacteria. Yeasts commonly mentioned include the teleomorphs Pichia anomala, Pichia membranifaciens, Debaryomyces hansenii and Kluyveromyces marxianus.

=== Sicilian or Greek fermentation ===
Applied to green, semiripe and ripe olives, the lye treatment process is skipped and the olives are placed directly in fermentation vessels full of brine (8–12% NaCl). The brine is changed on a regular basis to help remove the phenolic compounds. As the caustic treatment is avoided, lactic acid bacteria are only present in similar numbers to yeast and appear to be outdone by the abundant yeasts found on untreated olives. As very little acid is produced by the yeast fermentation, lactic, acetic, or citric acid is often added to the fermentation stage to stabilise the process.

=== Picholine or directly brined fermentation ===
Applied to green, semi-ripe, or ripe olives, they are soaked in lye typically for longer periods than Spanish style (e.g. 10–72 hours) until the solution has penetrated three-quarters of the way into the fruit. They are then washed and immediately brined and acid corrected with citric acid to achieve microbial stability. Fermentation still occurs carried out by acidogenic yeast and bacteria but is more subdued than other methods. The brine is changed on a regular basis to help remove the phenolic compounds, and a series of progressively stronger concentrations of salt are added until the product is fully stabilised and ready to be eaten.

=== Water-cured fermentation ===
Applied to green, semi-ripe, or ripe olives, these are soaked in water or weak brine and this solution is changed on a daily basis for 10–14 days. The oleuropein is naturally dissolved and leached into the water and removed during a continual soak-wash cycle. Fermentation takes place during the water treatment stage and involves a mixed yeast/bacteria ecosystem. Sometimes, the olives are lightly cracked with a blunt instrument to trigger fermentation and speed up the fermentation process. Once debittered, the olives are brined to concentrations of 8–12% NaCl and acid corrected and are then ready to eat.

=== Salt-cured fermentation ===
Applied only to ripe olives, since it is only a light fermentation. They are usually produced in Morocco, Turkey, and other eastern Mediterranean countries. Once picked, the olives are vigorously washed and packed in alternating layers with salt. The high concentration of salt draws the moisture out of olives, dehydrating and shriveling them until they look somewhat analogous to a raisin. Once packed in salt, fermentation is minimal and only initiated by the most halophilic yeast species such as Debaryomyces hansenii. Once cured, they are sold in their natural state without any additives. So-called oil-cured olives are cured in salt and then soaked in oil.

=== California or artificial ripening ===
Applied to green and semi-ripe olives, they are placed in lye and soaked. Upon their removal, they are washed in water injected with compressed air, without fermentation. This process is repeated several times until both oxygen and lye have soaked through to the stone. The repeated, saturated exposure to air oxidises the skin and flesh of the fruit, turning it black in an artificial process that mimics natural ripening. Once fully oxidised or "blackened", they are brined and acid corrected and are then ready for eating.
