= Morya =

Morya may refer to:

- Morya (Theosophy), one of the "Masters of the Ancient Wisdom" spoken of in modern Theosophy
- Morya Gosavi, a prominent saint of the Hindu Ganapatya sect
- Morya (film), 2011 Marathi film
- "Ganapati Bappa Morya", a chant in the Ganesh Chaturthi, a Hindu festival of Ganesha

== See also ==
- Moriya (disambiguation)
- Moira (disambiguation)
- Morea (disambiguation)
- Moria (disambiguation)
- Moriah (disambiguation)
- Mayura (disambiguation)
- Mauryan Empire, an empire in ancient India
- Maurya (film), a 2004 Indian Kannada-language sports drama film
- Maurya (surname), an Indian surname
