= Moira =

Moira may refer to:

== Places ==
=== Australia ===
- Moira, New South Wales, an Australian rural community
- County of Moira, Victoria, Australia
- Division of Moira, Victoria, Australia, an Electoral Division
- Shire of Moira, a local government area in Victoria, Australia

=== Canada ===
- Moira, Ontario, an unincorporated area
- Moira Lake, Ontario
- Moira River, Ontario

=== United Kingdom ===
- Moira, County Down, a village in Northern Ireland
  - Moira railway station
- Moira, Leicestershire, a village in England
  - Moira Furnace, nineteenth century iron-making blast furnace

=== United States ===
- Moira, New York, a town
- Moira Sound, Alaska

=== Elsewhere ===
- Moira, Achaea, a village in Greece
- Moira, Goa, a village in India
- 638 Moira, an asteroid

== People and fictional characters ==
- Moira (given name), including a list of women and fictional characters
- Gerald Moira (1867–1959), English painter

== Arts and entertainment ==
- Moira (album), a 2008 story album by the Japanese musical group Sound Horizon
- Moira (film), a 2015 Georgian film
- Moira (Utrecht), a music and art venue in Utrecht, Netherlands

== Ships ==
- HMS Moira (1805), a British Royal Navy schooner
- SS Moira, a Greek coaster in service during 1966

== Other uses ==
- Moira (military), a Greek military formation
- Moira (echinoderm), a genus of echinoderms in the family Schizasteridae
- Moira, the singular of Moirai (Fates), Greek deities, incarnations of destiny
- Earl of Moira, an extinct title in the Peerage of Ireland
- Moira (horse), a Canadian-bred Thoroughbred racehorse

== See also ==
- Moire (disambiguation)
- Morea (disambiguation)
- Moria (disambiguation)
- Morya (disambiguation)
- Moyra
