= NAGR =

NAGR may refer to:

- National Association for Gun Rights, a gun rights advocacy group in United States
- NAGR, the Delhi Metro station code for New Ashok Nagar metro station, New Delhi, India
