= Moriya =

Moriya may refer to:

- House of Moriya, a dynasty of Sri Lankan monarchs from 455–691
- Moreya (also Moriya), a Japanese god from myths and legends of the Suwa region in Nagano Prefecture
- Moriya (tribe), an ancient Indo-Aryan tribe of northeastern Indian subcontinent
- Moriya, Ibaraki, a city in Japan
- Suwako Moriya, a character in the vertically scrolling shoot 'em up game, Mountain of Faith
- Mount Moriya, an ice-covered peak in Lovech Heights, on Nordenskjöld Coast, in Graham Land, Antarctica
- Moriya people, Indigenous Muslim community of Assam

== People ==
- Moriya Jutanugarn (born 1994), Thai professional golfer

=== Japanese ===
- Akane Moriya (born 1997), Japanese singer and model
- Azuma Moriya (1884–1975), Japanese temperance activist
- Fumika Moriya (born 1992), Japanese volleyball player
- Hiroki Moriya (born 1990), Japanese tennis player
- Hiroshi Moriya, Japanese politician
- Keisuke Moriya (born 1986), Japanese former football player
- Kentaro Moriya (born 1988), Japanese footballer
- Kōki Moriya (born 1993), Japanese Nippon Professional Baseball pitcher
- Miyabi Moriya (born 1996), Japanese footballer
- Ryuichi Moriya (born 1985), Japanese archer
- Takemasa Moriya (born 1944), Japanese politician
- Tochigiyama Moriya (1892–1959), Japanese professional sumo wrestler

== See also ==
- Maurya (film) – 2004 Kannada language sports drama film
- Maurya (surname) – Indian surname
- Mauryan Empire – Ancient Indian empire (c. 321–185 BCE)
- Mayura (disambiguation)
- Mori (disambiguation)
- Morya (disambiguation)
