= Noria (disambiguation) =

A noria is a machine for lifting water into a small aqueduct.

Noria may also refer to:

- Asher Noria (born 1992), Indian sport shooter
- Noria Mabasa (born 1938), South African artist
- Noria Manouchi (born 1991), Swedish politician

== See also ==
- Moria (disambiguation)
- Na'ura, Arab town in Northern Israel
- Nora (disambiguation)
- Nori (disambiguation)
