= Moria (nymph) =

Nymph in Greek mythology

In Greek mythology, Moria (Ancient Greek: Μορια means "sacred olive-tree") was a Naiad nymph dwelling by the river Hermus. She was the sister of Tylus.

== Mythology ==
Moria makes an appearance in Nonnus' Dionysiaca, in an episode that is as follows. Tylus accidentally touched a serpent, which then attacked Tylus, coiled round his body and suffocated him; Tylus was not his first victim. Moria only could helplessly watch her brother die, but then Damasen, a Giant son of Gaia, arrived on the spot; Moria implored him to help and he killed the serpent, hitting it with the trunk of a tree he tore out of the ground. Then a female serpent, the slain monster's mate, appeared and used a magical herb, referred to as "Zeus' flower", to bring the dead serpent back to life. Moria then used the same herb to revive her brother.

It has been speculated that the myth of Moria, Tylus and Damasen may be rooted in Lydian mythology.

A similar story could be compared to that of Polyidus who used an herb to resurrect Glaucus, the son of Minos.
