= Majur =

Majur may refer to:

- Majur, Sisak-Moslavina County, a municipality in Croatia
- Majur, Zagreb County, a village near Farkaševac, Croatia
- Majur (singer), a Brazilian singer and songwriter
- Majur (Jagodina), a village in Serbia
- Majur (Šabac), a village in Serbia

== See also ==
- Mayur (disambiguation)
