= Mayuri =

Mayuri may refer to:

- Mayuri (film), a 1984 Telugu film produced by Ramoji Rao
- Maya (2015 Tamil film), released as Mayuri in Telugu
- Mayoori (actress) (1983–2005), a South Indian actress in Malayalam film industry
- Mayuri Upadhya, the Artistic Director of Nritarutya Dance Collective
- Mayuri Kurotsuchi. a character in the Bleach anime and manga
- Mayuri, a character in the anime movie Date A Live: Mayuri Judgment
- Mayuri veena, a variant of the Taus

== See also ==
- Mayura (disambiguation)
