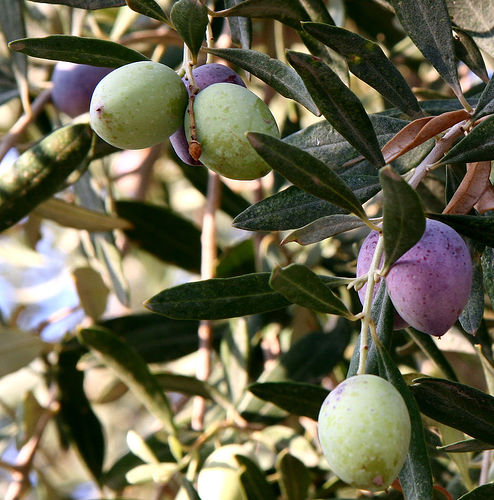

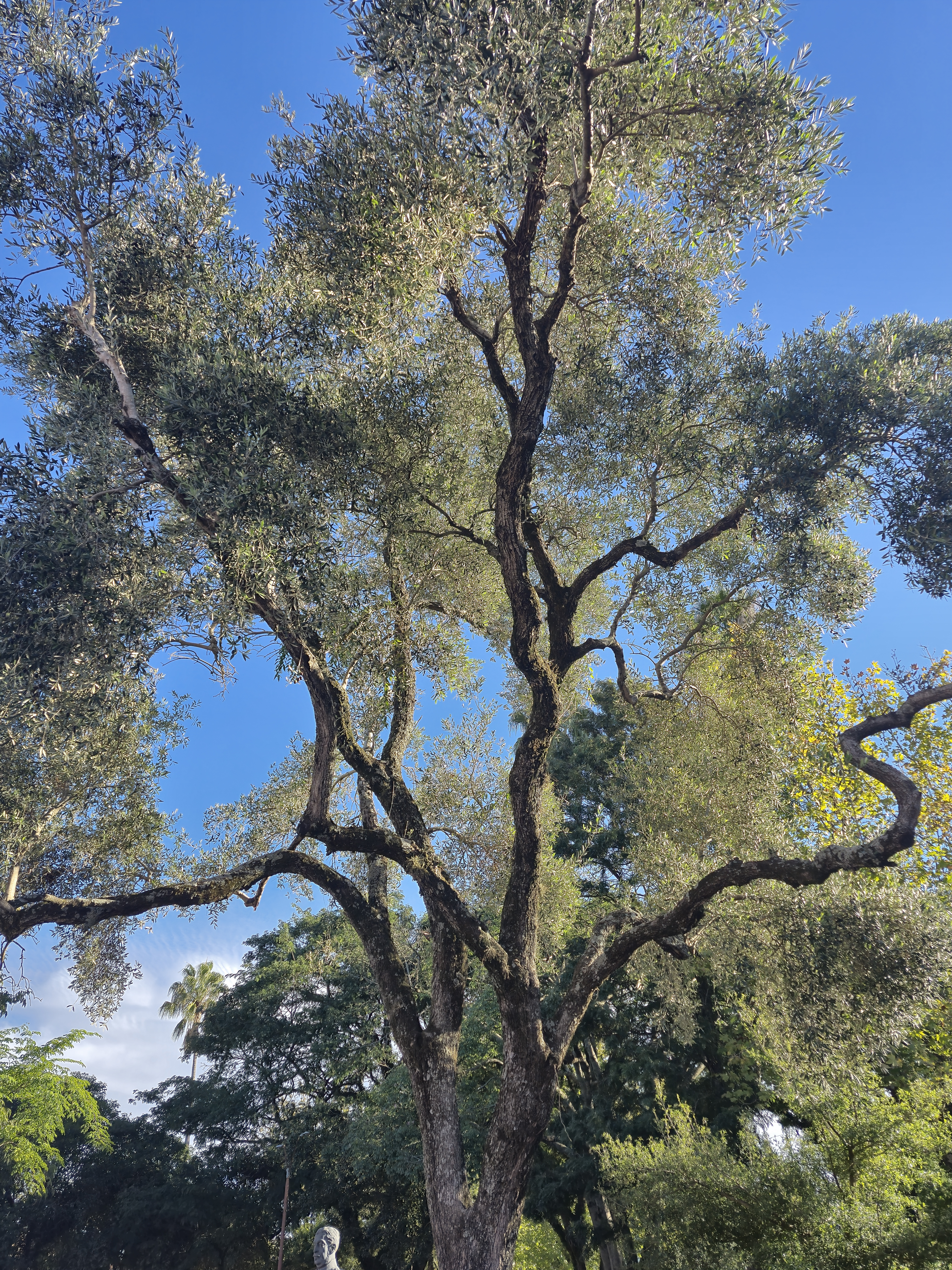
- Olea europaea subsp. europaea cultivated in Brazil

Conservation status
- Least Concern (IUCN 3.1)

Scientific classification
- Kingdom: Plantae
- Clade: Tracheophytes
- Clade: Angiosperms
- Clade: Eudicots
- Clade: Asterids
- Order: Lamiales
- Family: Oleaceae
- Genus: Olea
- Species: O. europaea
- Subspecies: O. e. subsp. europaea

Trinomial name
- Olea europaea subsp. europaea L.

= Olive =

Olive Temporal range: Late Pleistocene to recent, 0.06–0 Ma

Fruit of a cultivated plant

The cultivated olive (botanical name Olea europaea subsp. europaea) is a subspecies of subtropical evergreen tree in the family Oleaceae. Modern cultivars are traced primarily to the Near East, Aegean Sea, and Strait of Gibraltar. Olea europaea is the type species for its genus, Olea, which lends its name to the Oleaceae plant family. The olive fruit is classed botanically as a drupe, similar in structure and function to the cherry or peach. The term oil was originally synonymous with olive oil.

The olive has deep historical, economic, and cultural significance in the Mediterranean. It was one of the first fruit trees to be domesticated, being first cultivated in the Eastern Mediterranean between 6,000 and 4,000 BC. It gradually spread around the Mediterranean Basin via trade and human migration. Olive cultivation was vital to the growth and prosperity of several Mediterranean civilisations.

The fruit is eaten as table olives; the oil extracted from the fruit is used in food and formerly for lamp fuel; and the wood is used for decorative objects. The olive branch is a symbol of peace. The olive is a core ingredient in Middle Eastern and Mediterranean cuisines, particularly in the form of olive oil, and a defining feature of local landscapes, commerce, and folk traditions.

The olive is cultivated throughout the Mediterranean Basin, and in other regions with a suitable climate. Spain, Italy, and Greece lead the world in commercial olive production. There are many cultivars, some used primarily for oil, others for eating. Approximately 80% of all harvested olives are processed into oil, with the rest cured and fermented as table olives.

== Etymology ==
'Olive' and '(olive) oil' etymology

The word olive derives from Latin ŏlīva 'olive fruit; olive tree', from the archaic Proto-Greek form *ἐλαίϝα (*elaíwa) (Classic Greek ἐλαία elaía 'olive fruit; olive tree'). The word oil originally meant 'olive oil', from ŏlĕum, ἔλαιον (élaion 'olive oil'). The word for 'oil' in many other languages ultimately derives from the name of this tree and its fruit. The oldest attested forms of the Greek words are Mycenaean 𐀁𐀨𐀷, e-ra-wa, and 𐀁𐀨𐀺, e-ra-wo or 𐀁𐁉𐀺, e-rai-wo, written in the Linear B syllabic script.

== Description ==
The olive tree, Olea europaea, is an evergreen tree that grows in a Mediterranean climate. Its trunk is typically gnarled and twisted. It grows to some 10 m (35 ft) in height, with grey bark. The leaves are oblong, grey-green above and whitish below.

Small, white flowers are borne generally on the previous year's wood, in erect racemes springing from leaf axils. Each flower has four yellowish white petals fused at the bottom and joined to a base of four fused green sepals. The flower buds grow slowly for 4 to 6 weeks until they reach a length of about 2 cm and bloom; blooming lasts 5–6 days in hot weather and 2 weeks in colder areas.

The fruit is a small drupe, 1–2.5 cm (3/8–1 in) long when ripe. Wild olive trees have thinner-fleshed and smaller fruits than cultivated trees. O. europaea contains a pyrena called in British English a stone and in American English a pit.

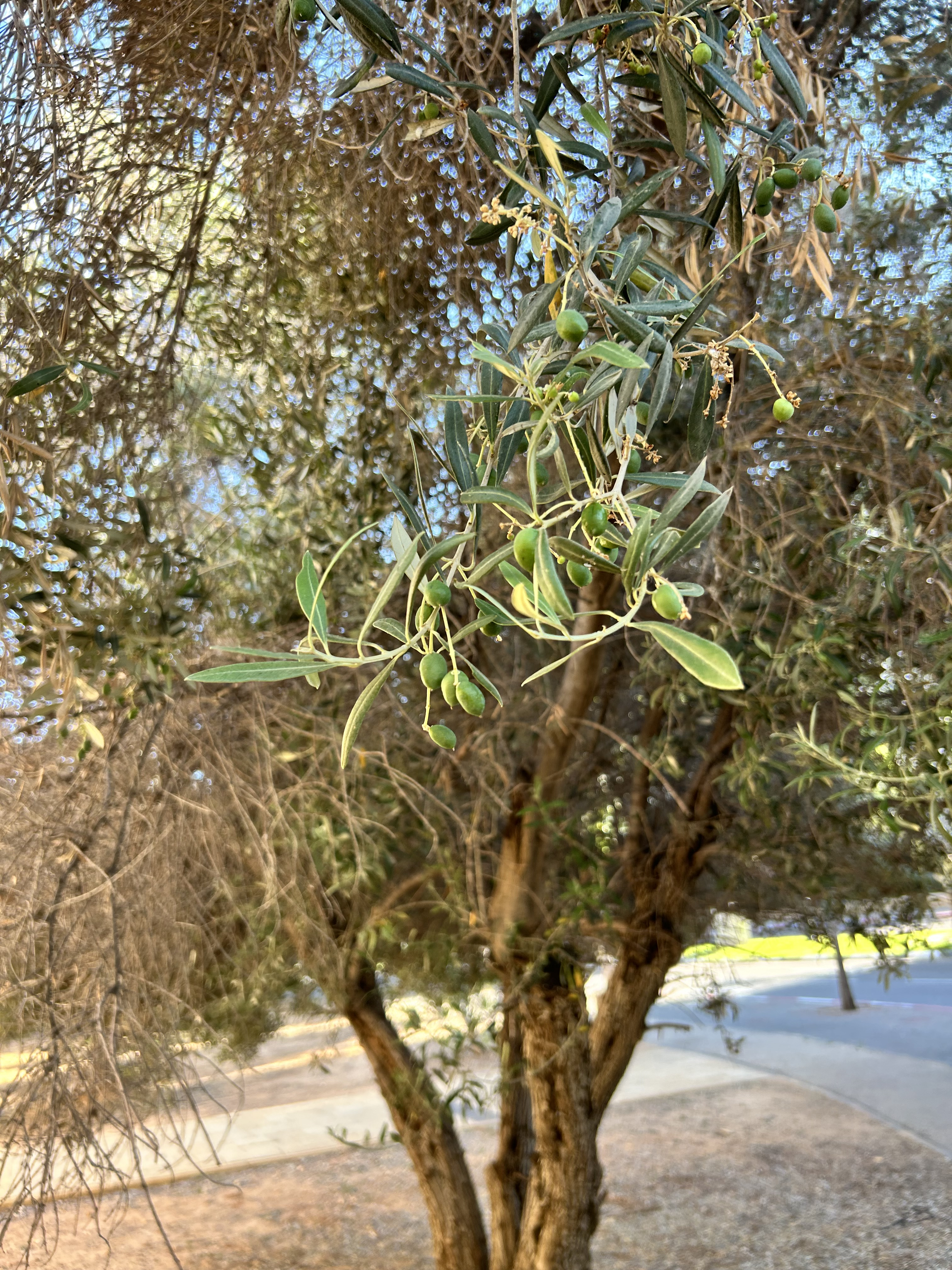
Unripe fruits on a cultivated tree in Israel

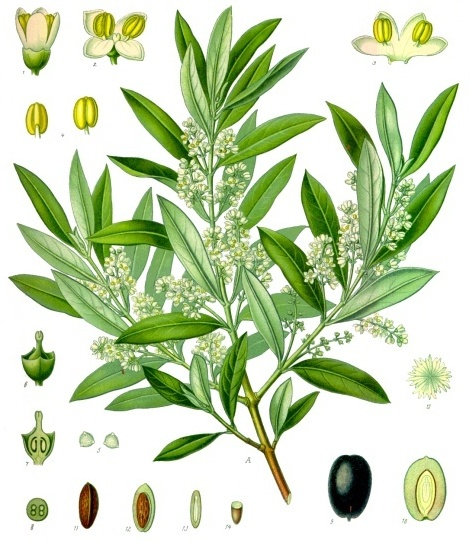
19th-century illustration

== History ==
As one of the oldest cultivated fruit trees on Earth, the history of the olive is deeply intertwined with humans: its ecological success and expansion are largely the result of human activity rather than environmental conditions, with the tree's genetic and geographic trajectory directly reflecting the rise and fall of several civilisations. Owing to this relationship with humans the olive has been disseminated well beyond its native range, spanning 28.6 million acres across 66 countries. Fossil evidence indicates that the olive tree had its origins 20–40 million years ago in the Oligocene, in what now corresponds to Italy and the eastern Mediterranean Basin.

Around 100,000 years ago, olives were used by humans in Africa, on the Atlantic coast of Morocco, for fuel and most probably consumption. The olive was first cultivated in the Mediterranean between 8,000 and 6,000 years ago. Its cultivation gradually spread globally through human migration and settlement, particularly to regions with a Mediterranean climate; Spanish colonists brought the olive to the New World in the 18th century, while olive trees were introduced to Japan in 1908 on Shodo Island, which accounts for more than 95% of the country's olive production. Fifty-eight countries across five continents produce olive oil.

== Cultivation ==
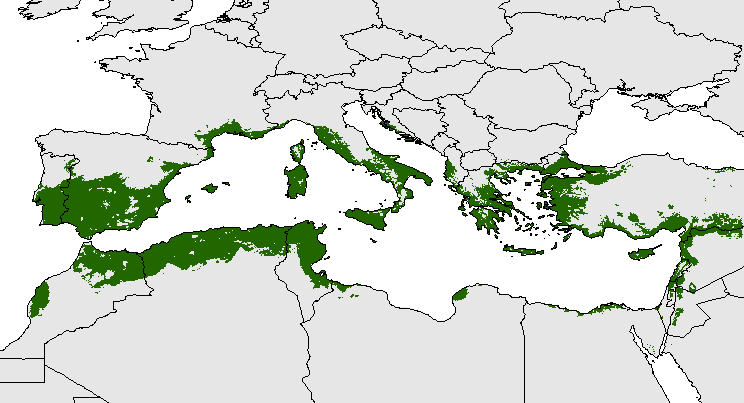
Areas of cultivation in green

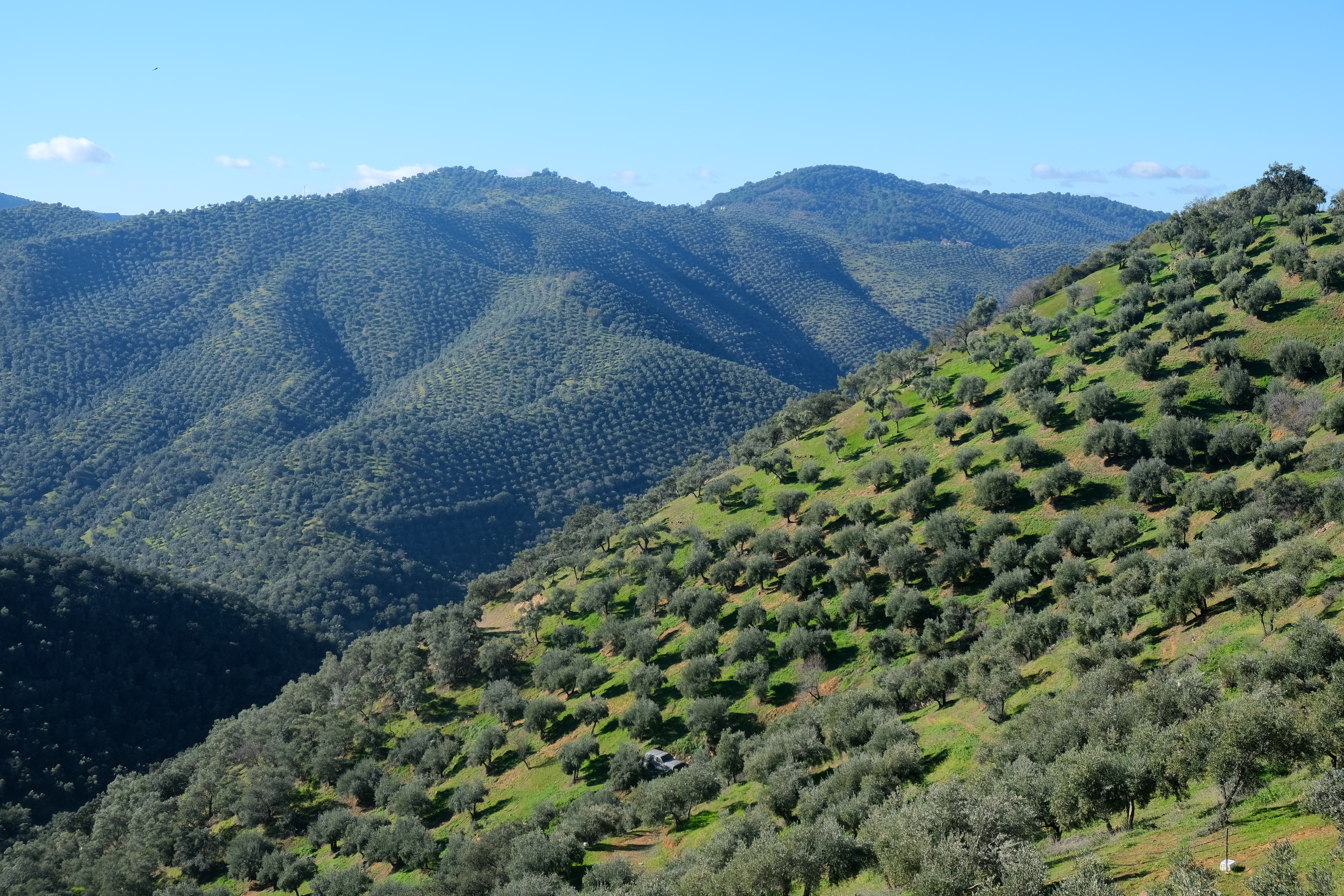
Andalucía, Spain

Olives are cultivated in the Mediterranean basin and some countries with non-Mediterranean climates such as Argentina, Australia, Chile and Peru.

=== Growth and propagation ===
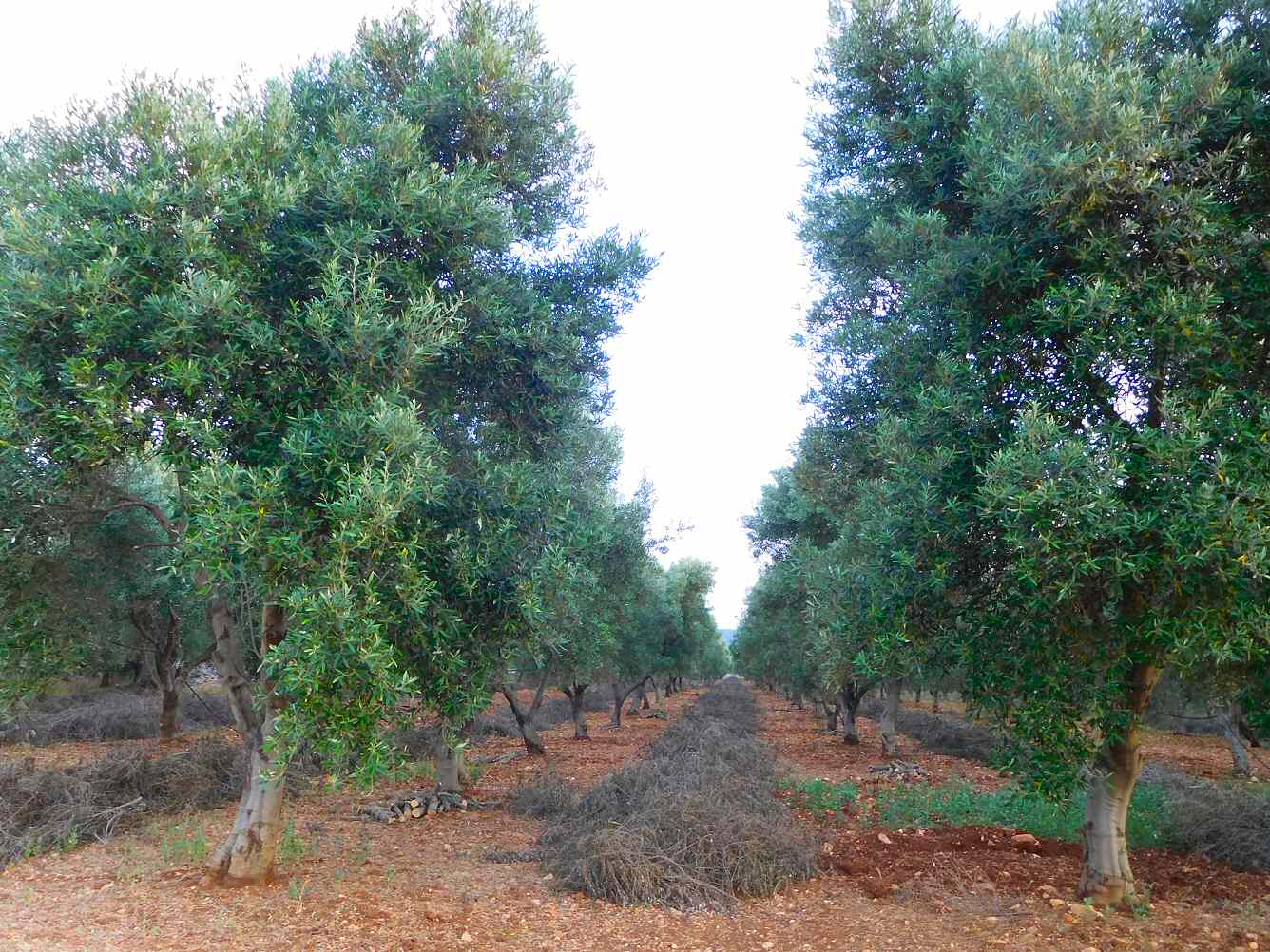
Pruned trees in Ostuni, Apulia, Italy

Olive trees prefer calcareous soils; they grow best on limestone slopes and crags and in coastal climates. They can grow in any light soil, even on well-drained clay, but in rich soils they are predisposed to disease and produce poor-quality oil, as noted by Pliny the Elder. Olives like hot weather and sunny positions without any shade. Temperatures below −10 °C (14 °F) may injure even a mature tree. They tolerate drought well because of their sturdy and extensive root systems. Olive trees can remain productive for centuries as long as they are pruned correctly and regularly.

Olives are propagated by various methods, especially by cuttings and layering; the trees root easily in favourable soil and throw up suckers from the stump when cut down. Trees can also be grown from seed. However yields from trees grown from suckers or seeds are poor; they have to be budded or grafted to do well. To facilitate germination, the oily pericarp is softened by slight rotting,or soaked in hot water or in an alkaline solution.

When extreme cold has damaged or killed the above-ground parts of the tree, the rootstock can survive and produce new shoots, which in turn become new trees. In this way olive trees can regenerate. In Tuscany in 1985 a severe frost destroyed many productive and aged olive trees and ruined farmers' livelihoods; recovery was expected to take four or five years.

=== Cultivars ===
There are hundreds of cultivars of the olive. An olive's cultivar has a significant impact on its colour, size, shape and growth characteristics as well as the qualities of olive oil. An olive cultivar may produce oil, table olives or both.

Since many olive cultivars are almost or completely self-incompatible, they are usually planted in pairs with a single primary cultivar and a secondary cultivar selected for its ability to fertilise the primary one. The self-incompatibility system has only two groups, based on a gene with just two alleles, causing the extreme self-sterility seen in the olive.

Breeding efforts have been directed at producing hybrid cultivars with qualities useful to farmers, such as resistance to the fungal disease Verticillium wilt.

=== Pests, diseases and weather ===
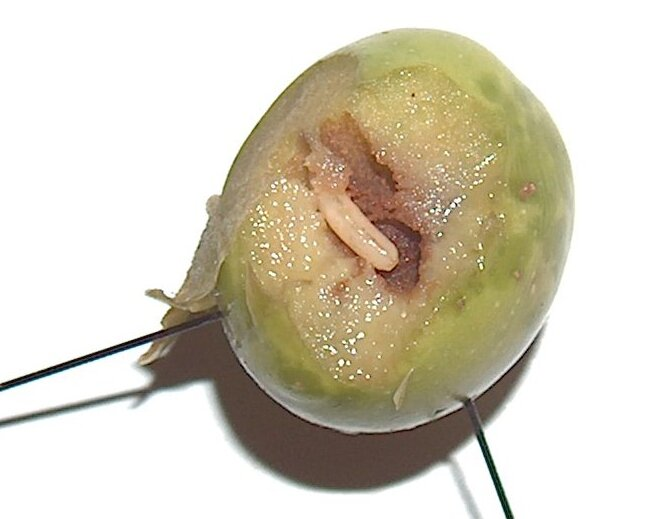
The olive fruit fly is a commercial pest, damaging the fruit. 3rd instar larva shown.

A serious pest of cultivation is the olive fruit fly (Bactrocera oleae), which lays its eggs in the fruit. The pulp around the puncture rots and becomes bitter, making the olive unfit for eating. The pest can cause total loss of table-olive crops and can reduce oil value by 80%.

The caterpillar of the olive moth, Prays oleae, forms mines inside the tree's leaves in spring and pupates there. Second and third generations the same year cause damage to leaves, flowers and fruits.

A fungus, Spilocaea oleaginea, infects trees for several successive seasons, causing olive peacock spot disease, which does great damage to plantations. It blemishes the fruit, delays ripening, and reduces oil yield.

A bacterium, Pseudomonas savastanoi pv. oleae, induces tumour growth in the shoots.

Xylella fastidiosa bacteria, which infect citrus fruit and vines, have attacked olive trees in Apulia, southern Italy, causing olive quick decline syndrome. The main vector is Philaenus spumarius (meadow spittlebug).

At the northern edge of their cultivation zone, for instance in northern Italy, southern France and Switzerland, olive trees are limited by frost. Gales and long-continued rains during the gathering season cause damage. In the colder Mediterranean hinterland, olive cultivation is replaced by other fruit, typically sweet chestnut.

=== As an invasive species ===
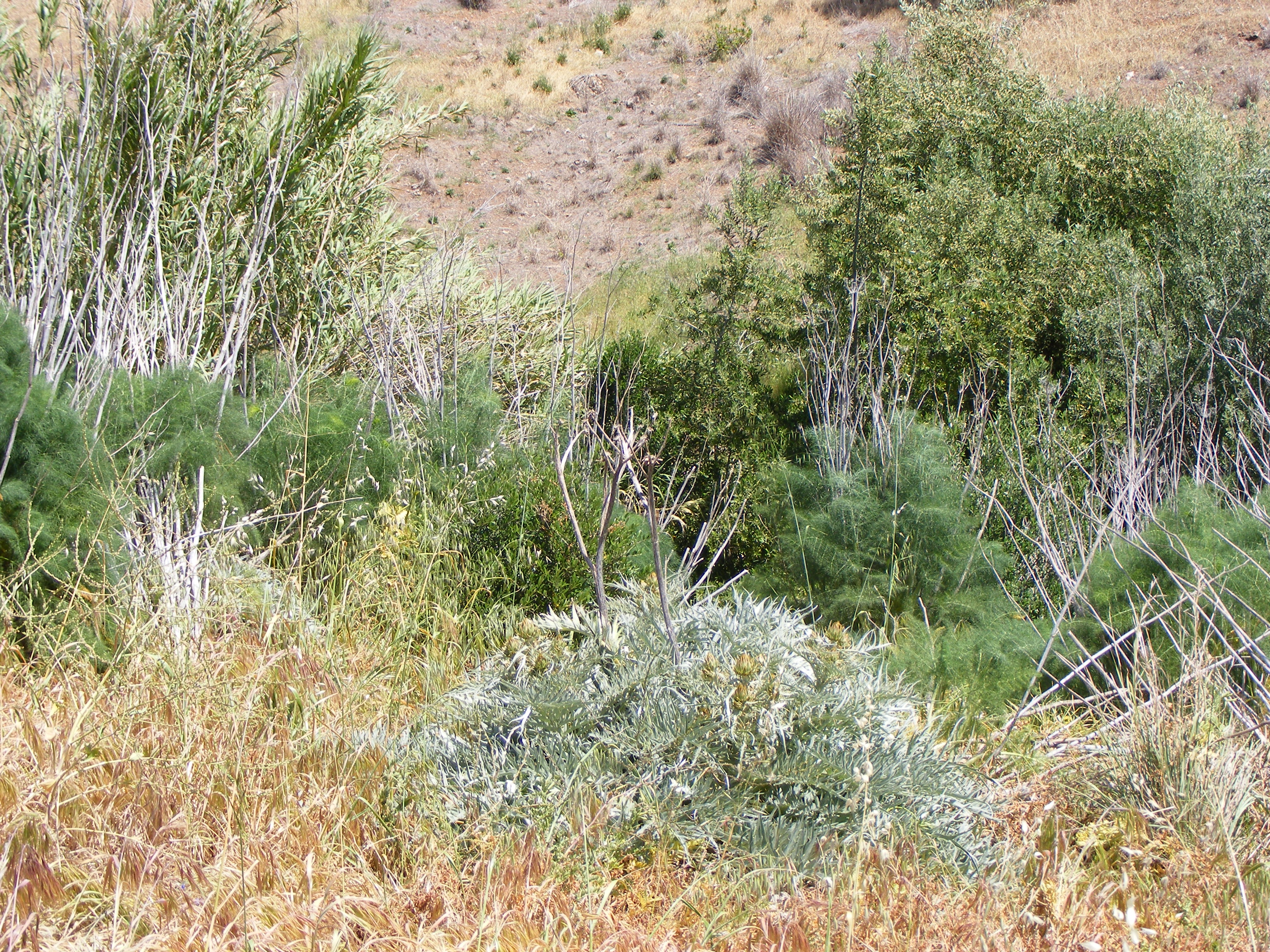
As an invasive weed, Adelaide Hills, South Australia

Since its domestication the olive has repeatedly escaped to the wild, with feral plants swamping the original wild populations of southern Europe.

In South Australia the olive is a serious invasive species affecting native vegetation. In that region its seeds are spread by the introduced red fox and by birds including the European starling and the emu. They germinate in woodlands, growing to form a dense canopy that crowds out native tree seedlings. As the climate there is dry and prone to bushfires, the oil-rich feral olive tree substantially increases the fire hazard of native sclerophyll woodlands.

=== Harvesting ===
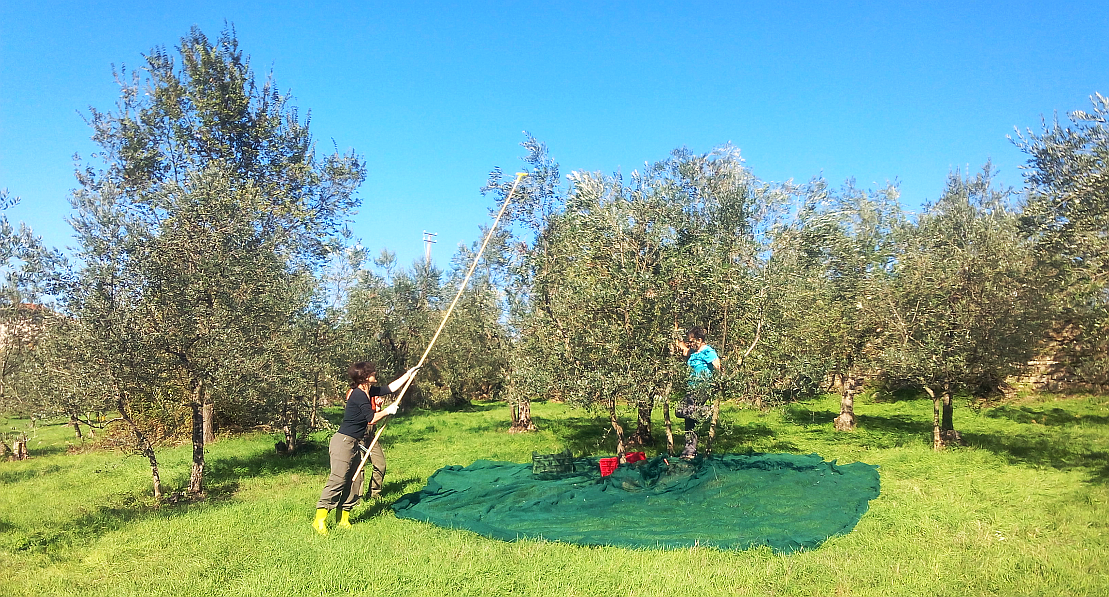
Olive harvest in Baruffi (Impruneta, Tuscany, Italy) in 2016

In the Mediterranean region olives are harvested in the autumn, from October onwards. Most olives are harvested by shaking the tree or individual branches. Another effective method is for harvesters to stand on a ladder with a sack tied around their waist; they then "milk" the olives into the sack. Varieties for table olives are more delicate to harvest, since damaged fruit becomes bitter; baskets that hang around the worker's neck are used. In some places in Italy, Croatia and Greece olives are harvested by hand because the terrain is too mountainous for machines. As a result the fruit is not bruised, which leads to a superior finished product. The method involves sawing off branches, which is healthy for future production. The amount of oil in the fruit varies greatly by cultivar; the pericarp is usually 60–70% oil. Typical yields are 1.5–2.2 kg (3 lb 5 oz – 4 lb 14 oz) of oil per tree per year.

== Longevity ==
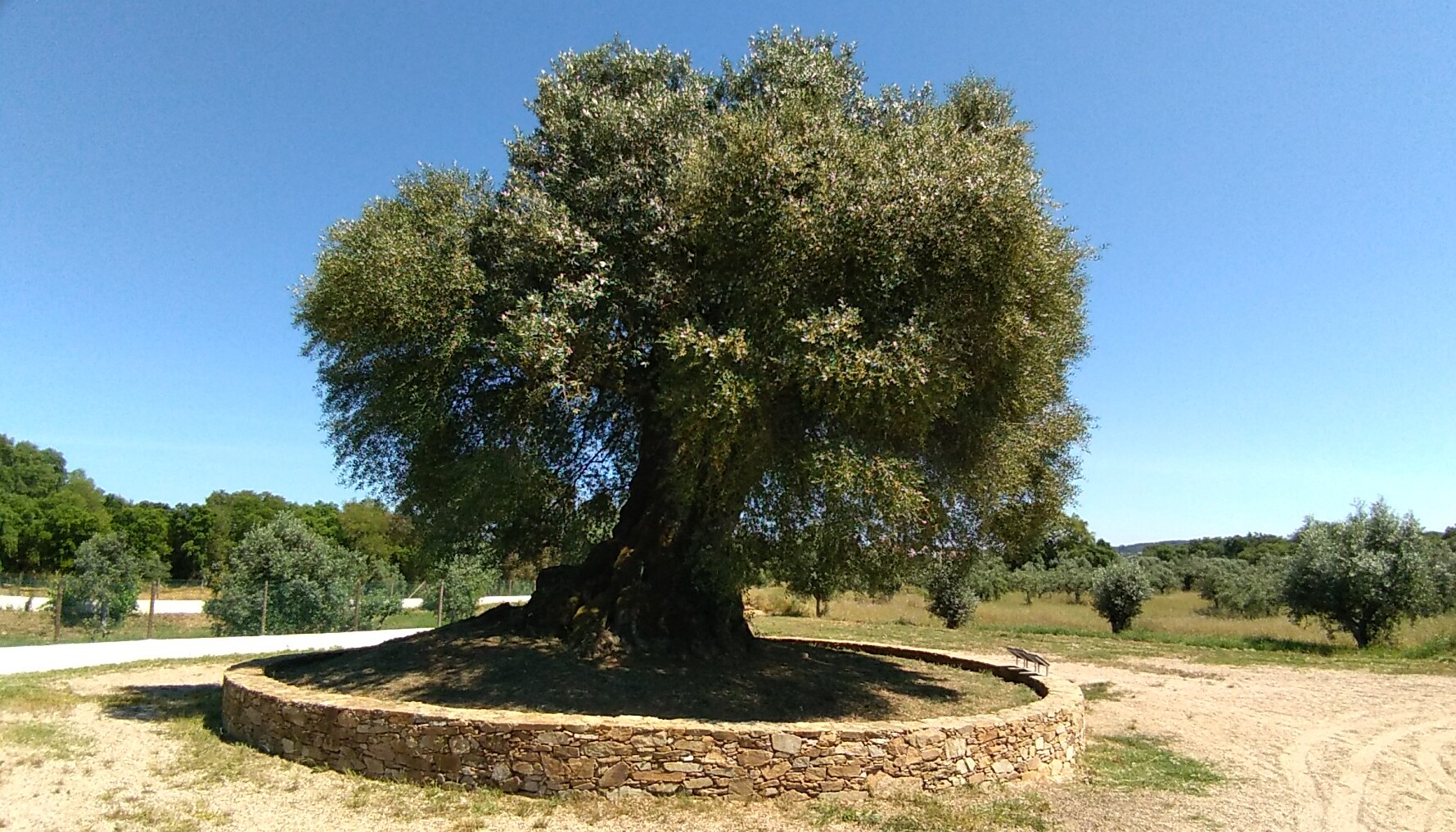
The Oliveira de Mouchão in Mouriscas, Abrantes, Portugal, has a claimed age of 3,350 years.

Olive trees have been venerated for their resilience and longevity since antiquity: several specimens are reputed to be several thousand years old. However compared with other woody plants, the exact lifespan is difficult to determine through common methods such as dendrochronology (analysing tree rings) owing to the olive tree's irregular growth patterns, which may include missing annual tree rings, hollowed-out interiors, and multiple trunks. For example a 2013 study revealed wide disparities among different laboratories conducting tree-ring dating of the same specimens. Although age can be inferred from a tree's diameter, the method is imperfect owing to a range of other factors that affect size and length, such as soil fertility and climatic conditions. Based on a combination of tree-ring and radiocarbon dating, olive trees have maximum ages between 300 and 500 years, with some research finding that most of the oldest trees had lived for up to 700 years. An olive tree in Mouriscas, Abrantes, Portugal, Oliveira do Mouchão, has a claimed age of 3,350 years.

== Production ==
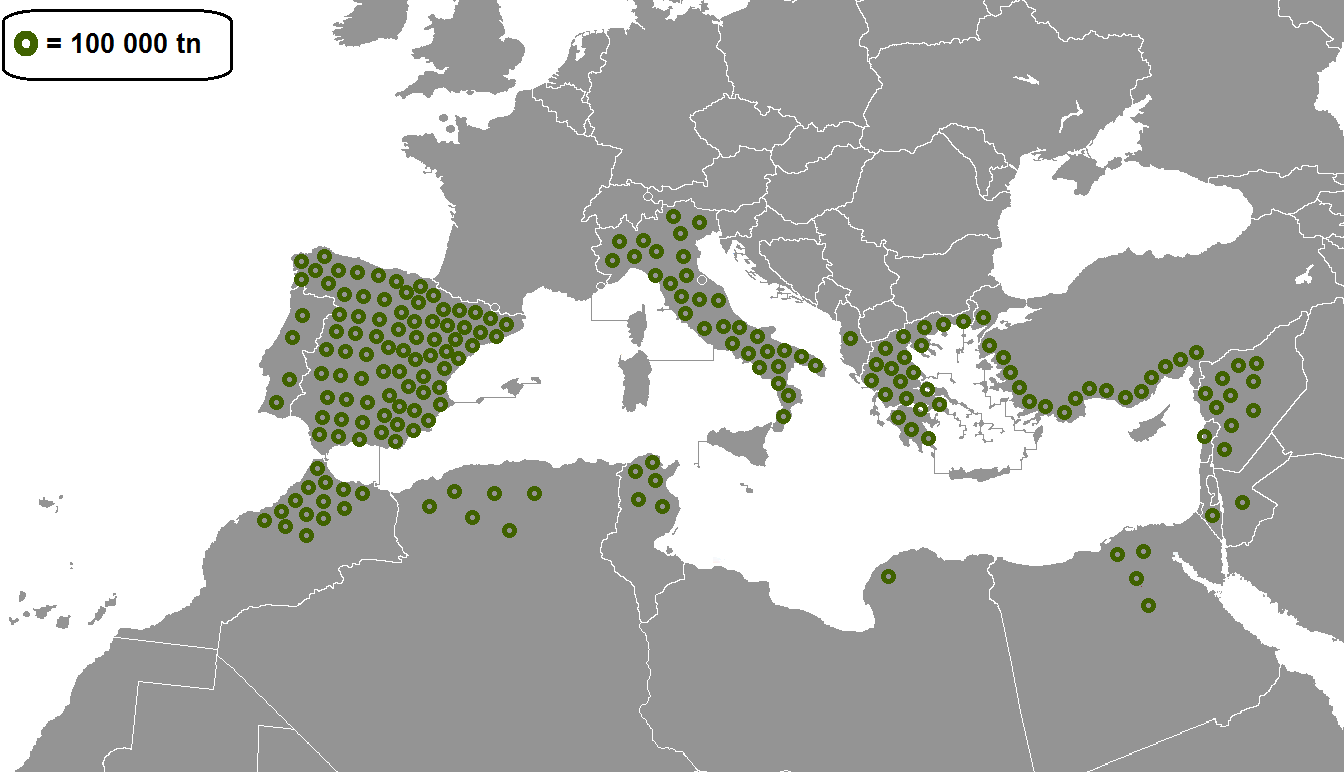
o=100,000 tonnes/year. Location of symbols is diagrammatic.

Main countries of production (as of 2016 per FAOSTAT)
Country/Region	Production (tonnes)	Cultivated area (hectares)	Yield (tonnes/ha)
World	19,267,000	10,650,000	1.8091
European Union	11,686,528	5,028,637	2.3240
Spain	6,560,000	2,573,000	2.5490
Greece	2,343,000	887,000	2.6414
Italy	2,092,000	1,165,000	1.7950
Turkey	1,730,000	846,000	2.0460
Morocco	1,416,000	1,008,000	1.4044
Syria	899,000	765,000	1.1748
Tunisia	700,000	1,646,000	0.4253
Algeria	697,000	424,000	1.6437
Egypt	694,000	67,000	6.7293
Portugal	617,000	355,000	1.7394

Olives are among the most extensively cultivated fruit crops in the world. As of 2024, 58 countries across five continents maintained commercial olive groves, which occupied roughly 11.6 million hectares (28.6 million acres), a quarter of the world's permanent cultivated area. By comparison, in 2011 about 9.6 million hectares (24 million acres) were planted with olive trees, which was more than twice the amount of land devoted to apples, bananas or mangoes; only coconut trees and oil palms commanded more space.

According to the Food and Agriculture Organization the 10 leading producers are all in the Mediterranean region and responsible for 95% of the world's olives. Spain is the world's leading producer and devotes the largest land area to olive cultivation, with more than 180 million trees spanning more than 2,507,684 hectares, followed by Tunisia (1,746,360 ha) and Italy (1,143,363 ha). In Italy, olive tree cultivation is widespread in the south, accounting for three quarters of its production; it is less abundant in the colder north of Italy, although production there has increased, particularly in the more temperate microclimates of Liguria and the hills around Lake Garda. Approximately 170 million plants are distributed over one million farms.

Global production of olive oil has more than doubled from 1.4 million tons in the late 1980s, to an estimated 3.4 million tons in 2026. Spain is by far the largest producer, making up 25% of the global supply, followed by Italy, Morocco and Tunisia. The European Union (including Spain, Greece and Italy) is responsible for nearly 60% of the world's olive oil.

Production of olives

Olive yield

== Nutrition ==
Olives, green
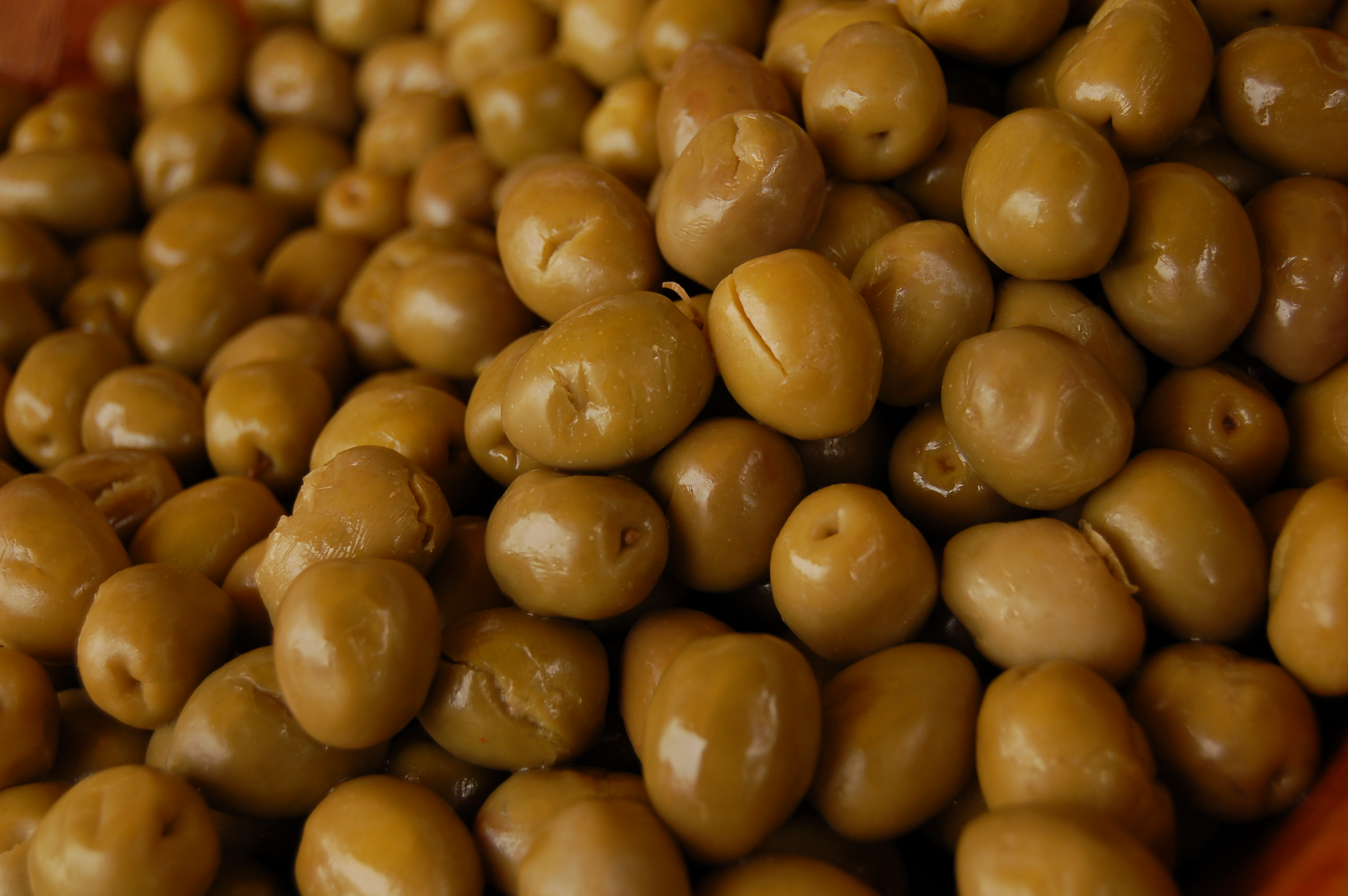
- Marinated green olives

Nutritional value per 100 g (3.5 oz)
- Energy: 609 kJ (146 kcal)
- Carbohydrates: 3.84 g
- Sugars: 0.54 g
- Dietary fibre: 3.3 g
- Fat: 15.32 g
- Saturated: 2.029 g
- Monounsaturated: 11.314 g
- Polyunsaturated: 1.307 g
- Protein: 1.03 g
Vitamins and minerals
Vitamins	Quantity %DV^{†}
Vitamin A equiv. beta-Carotene lutein zeaxanthin	2% 20 μg 2% 231 μg 510 μg
Thiamine (B1)	2% 0.021 mg
Riboflavin (B2)	1% 0.007 mg
Niacin (B3)	1% 0.237 mg
Vitamin B6	2% 0.031 mg
Folate (B9)	1% 3 μg
Choline	3% 14.2 mg
Vitamin E	25% 3.81 mg
Vitamin K	1% 1.4 μg
Minerals	Quantity %DV^{†}
Calcium	4% 52 mg
Iron	3% 0.49 mg
Magnesium	3% 11 mg
Phosphorus	0% 4 mg
Potassium	1% 42 mg
Sodium	68% 1556 mg
- Other constituents: Quantity
- Water: 75.3 g
- Full Link to USDA Database entry
- ^{†}Percentages estimated using US recommendations for adults, except for potassium, which is estimated based on expert recommendation from the National Academies.

A 100-gram (3 1/2-ounce) reference serving of cured green olives provides 609 kilojoules (146 kilocalories) of food energy, is a rich source of vitamin E (25% of the Daily Value, DV), and contains a large amount of sodium (104% DV); other nutrients are insignificant. Green olives are 75% water, 15% fat, 4% carbohydrates and 1% protein (table).

The polyphenol composition of olives varies during ripening and during fermentation for table olives or crushing for oil. In raw fruit, polyphenol content, as measured by the Folin method, is 117 mg/100 g in black olives and 161 mg/100 g in green olives, compared with 55 and 21 mg/100 g for extra-virgin and virgin olive oil respectively. Olives contain several types of polyphenol, mainly tyrosols, phenolic acids, flavonols and flavones, and black olives contain anthocyanins. The bitter flavour of uncured olives results mainly from oleuropein and aglycone, which total 72 and 82 mg/100 g in black olives and 56 and 59 mg/100 g in green olives respectively.

During the crushing, kneading and extraction of olive fruit to obtain olive oil, oleuropein, demethyloleuropein and ligstroside are hydrolyzed by endogenous beta-glucosidases to form aldehydes, dialdehydes, and aldehydic aglycones. Polyphenol content varies with olive cultivar and the manner of presentation; plain olives contain more than those that are stoned or stuffed.

Olive-tree pollen is extremely allergenic, with an OPALS allergy -scale rating of 10 out of 10.

== Uses ==
Yearly per capita supply of olives

The olive tree, Olea europaea, has been cultivated for table olives—the tree's fruit, olive oil, its decorative wood and for ornamental use. About 80% of all harvested olives are used for oil and the rest as table olives. The olive is one of the "trinity" or "triad" of basic ingredients in Mediterranean cuisine, along with wheat (for bread, pasta and couscous) and the grape (for wine).

=== Table olives ===
==== Fermentation and curing ====
Raw olives are naturally very bitter and astringent; to make them palatable, olives must be cured and fermented, thereby removing substantial amounts of bitter phenolic compounds, especially oleuropein. The curing process may take from a few days with lye to a few months with brine or salt packing. Many of the fermentations are carried out by lactic acid bacteria; the lactic acid that they produce makes the olives more acidic, preventing the growth of harmful species of bacteria, so the table olives can be stored without refrigeration.

==== Classes ====
Table olives are classified by the International Olive Council (IOC) into three groups according to the degree of ripeness achieved before harvesting:

1. Green olives are picked when they have obtained full size, while unripe; they are usually shades of green to yellow and contain the bitter phytochemical oleuropein.
2. Semi-ripe or turning-colour olives are picked at the beginning of the ripening cycle, when the colour has begun to change from green to multicolour shades of red to brown. Only the skin is coloured, as the flesh of the fruit lacks pigmentation at this stage, unlike that of the ripe fruit.
3. Black olives or ripe olives are picked at full maturity, displaying colours of purple, brown or black.
Table olives

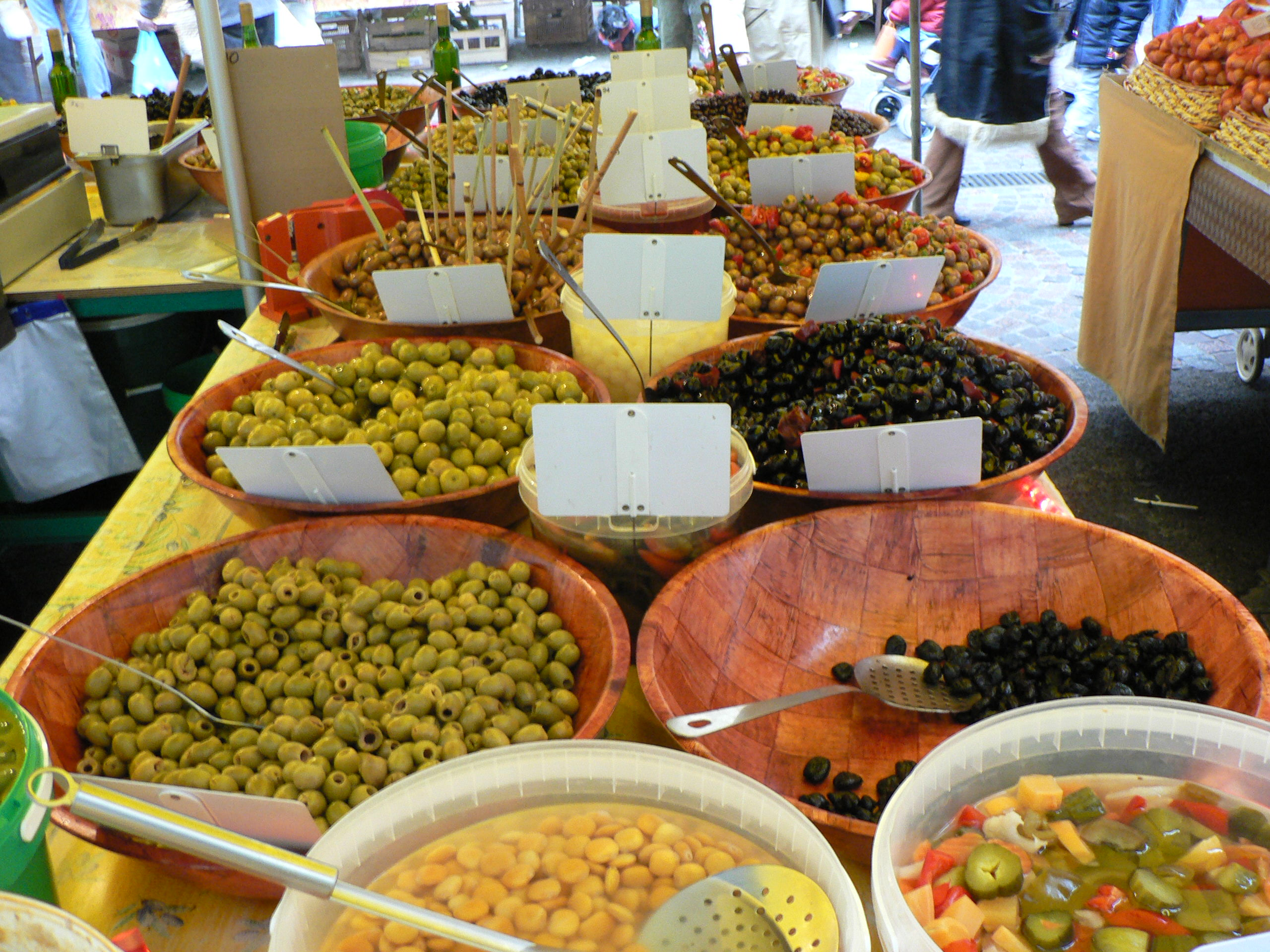
Olives at a market in Toulon, France

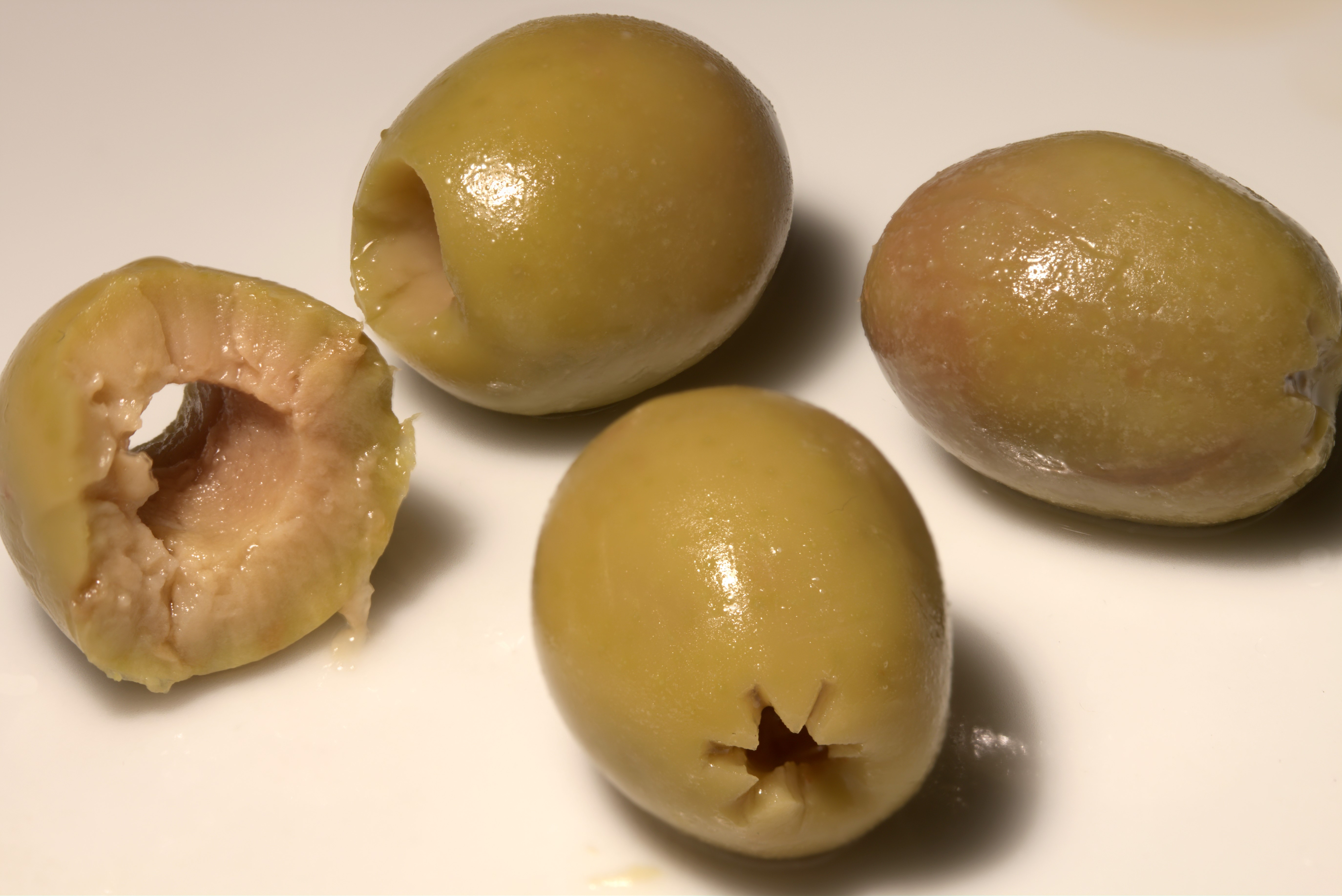
Green

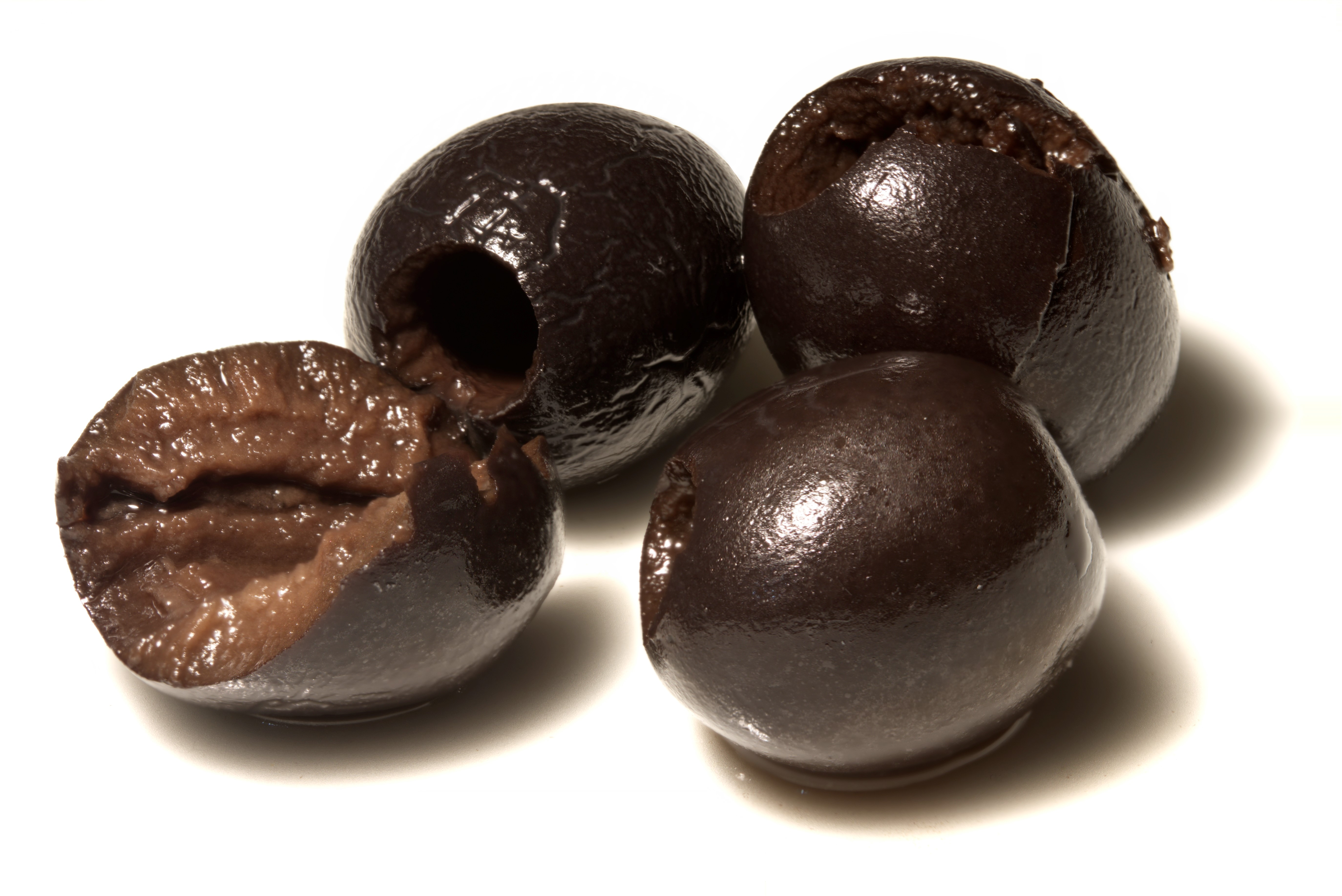
Black

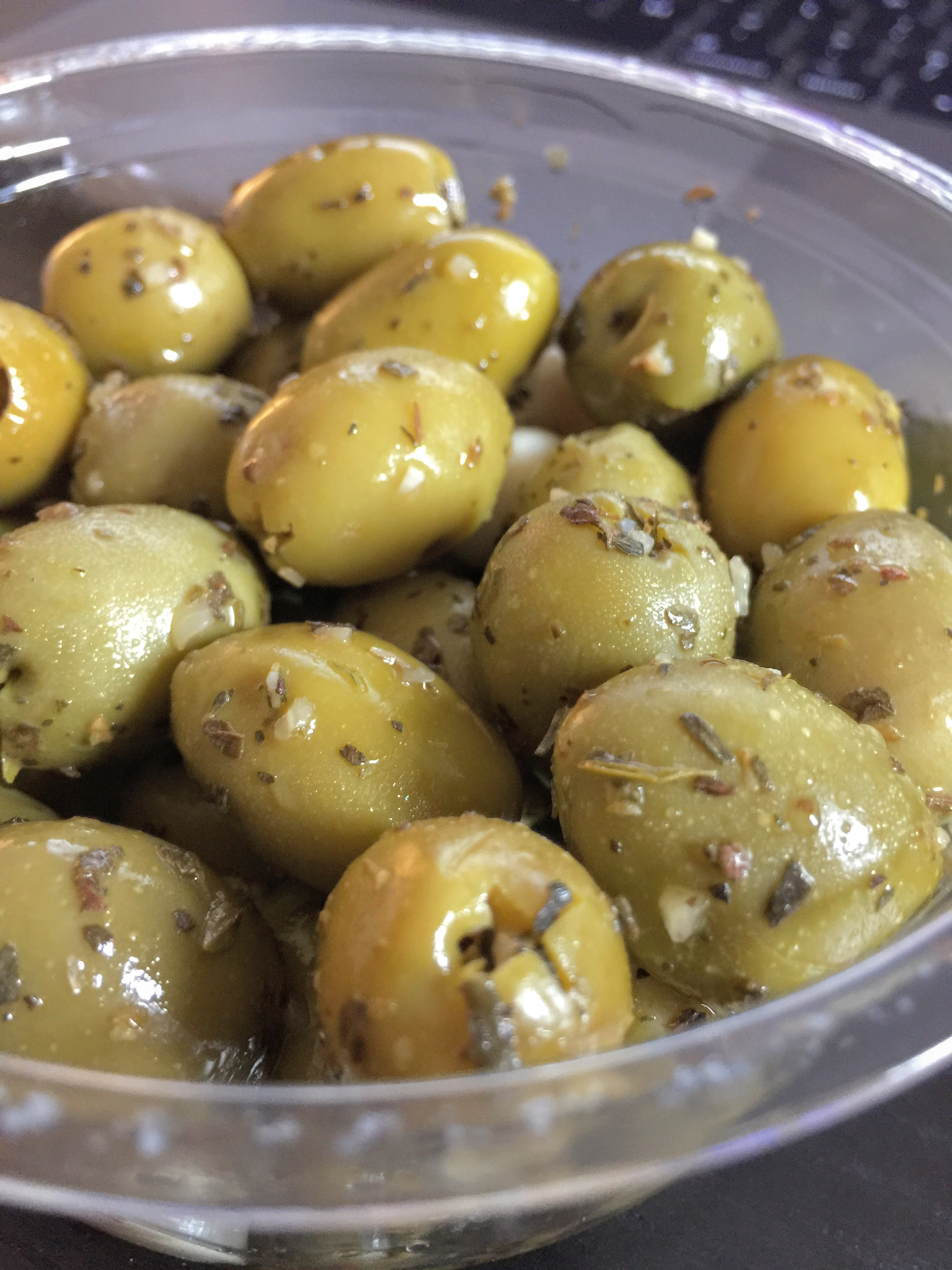
With herbs

=== Olive oil ===
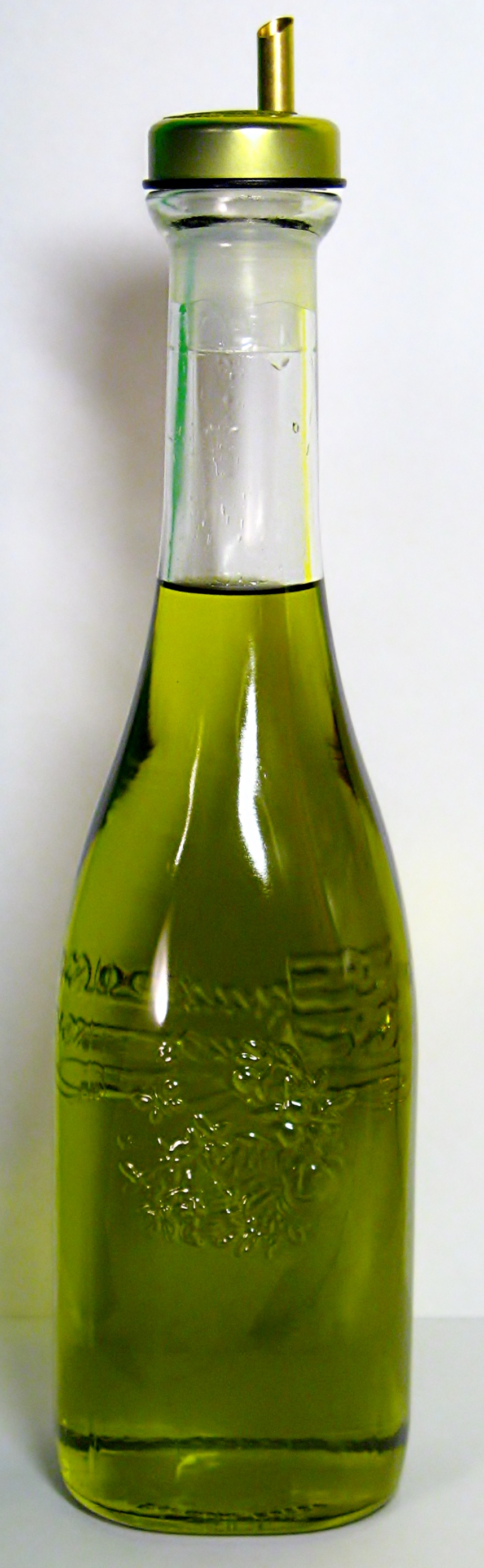
An Italian olive oil

Olive oil is a vegetable oil obtained by pressing whole olives. It is used for culinary purposes, and also for medication and as a fuel.

The composition of olive oil varies with the cultivar, elevation, time of harvest and extraction process. It consists mainly of oleic acid (up to 83%), with smaller amounts of other fatty acids including linoleic acid (up to 21%) and palmitic acid (up to 20%). Extra virgin olive oil (EVOO) is required to have no more than 0.8% free acidity and fruity flavour characteristics.

=== Other uses ===
Olive wood is hard, straight-grained and dense, often presenting an attractive pattern. It is suitable for indoor usage but outdoor use is precluded by its vulnerability to weather and to insect damage.

In modern landscape design olive trees are frequently used as ornamental features for their distinctively gnarled trunks and evergreen silvery-grey foliage. Smaller cultivars have become increasingly popular as indoor plants owing to their resilience and aesthetic appeal.

The pressing of olives to create olive oil results in a liquid byproduct known as amurca or olive-mill waste water. Owing to its bitterness and unpleasant aroma it was historically discarded, though many uses for it have been proposed.

The hard, inedible seed or stone of the olive fruit could potentially be used for biofuel, activated carbon (for water filtration and absorption), furfural production, filler, animal feed or resin formation. Spain produces about 400,000 tons of olive stones annually, which are mostly used as biomass for residential boilers, olive mills and some industries.

Olive-tree cultivation has been linked to promoting biodiversity, improving soil quality, and mitigating climate change through carbon sequestration. As long-lived perennial plants, they absorb carbon dioxide over long time frames, with groves sequestering approximately 2.2 to 4.5 metric tons of carbon dioxide (CO_{2}) per hectare annually.

Uses of olive trees

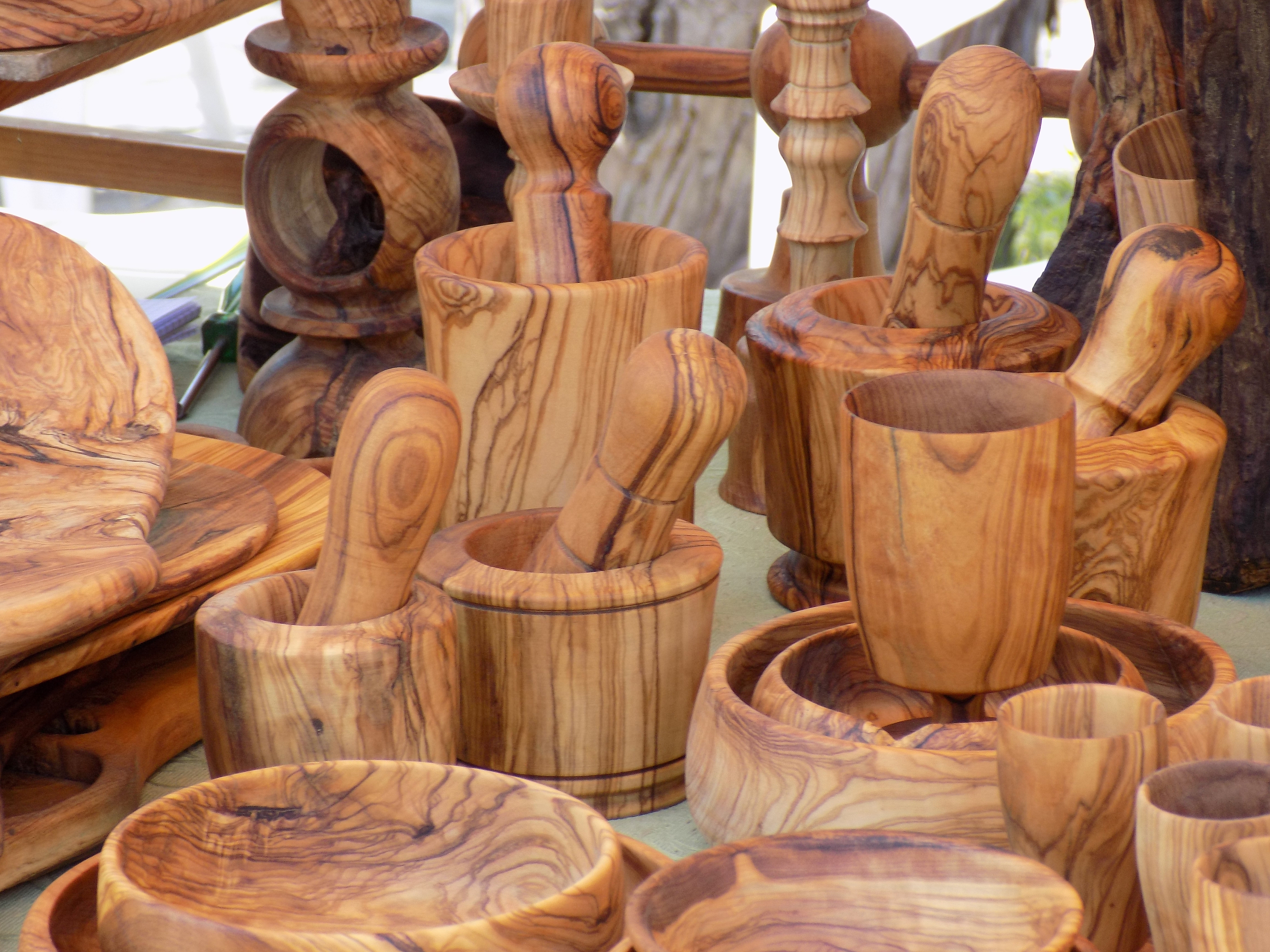
Olive wood is prized for its durability and attractive appearance, for indoor objects such as this cookware.

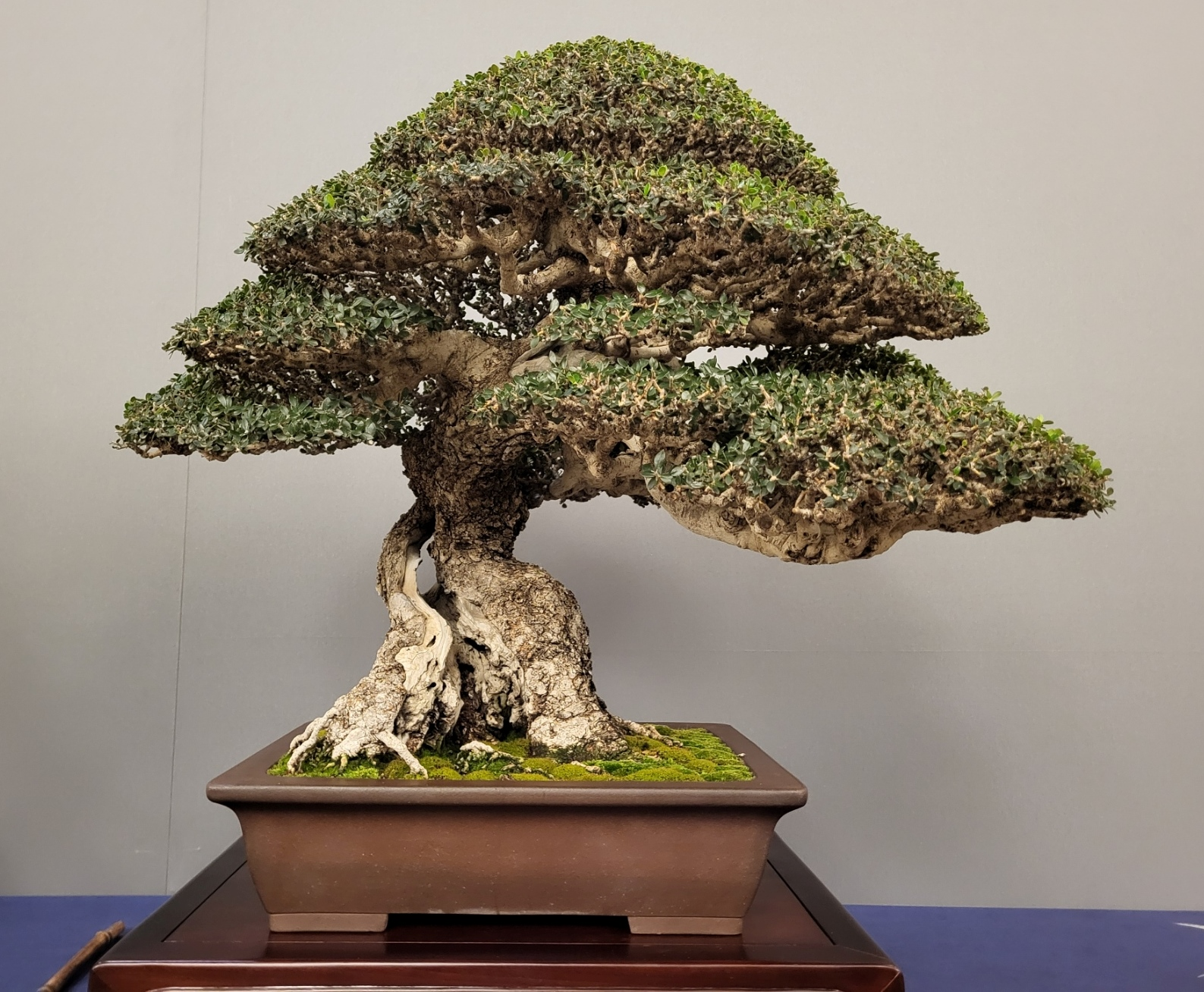
Olea europaea sylvestris as bonsai, valued for their tiny leaves and rough bark

== Symbolic and cultural significance ==
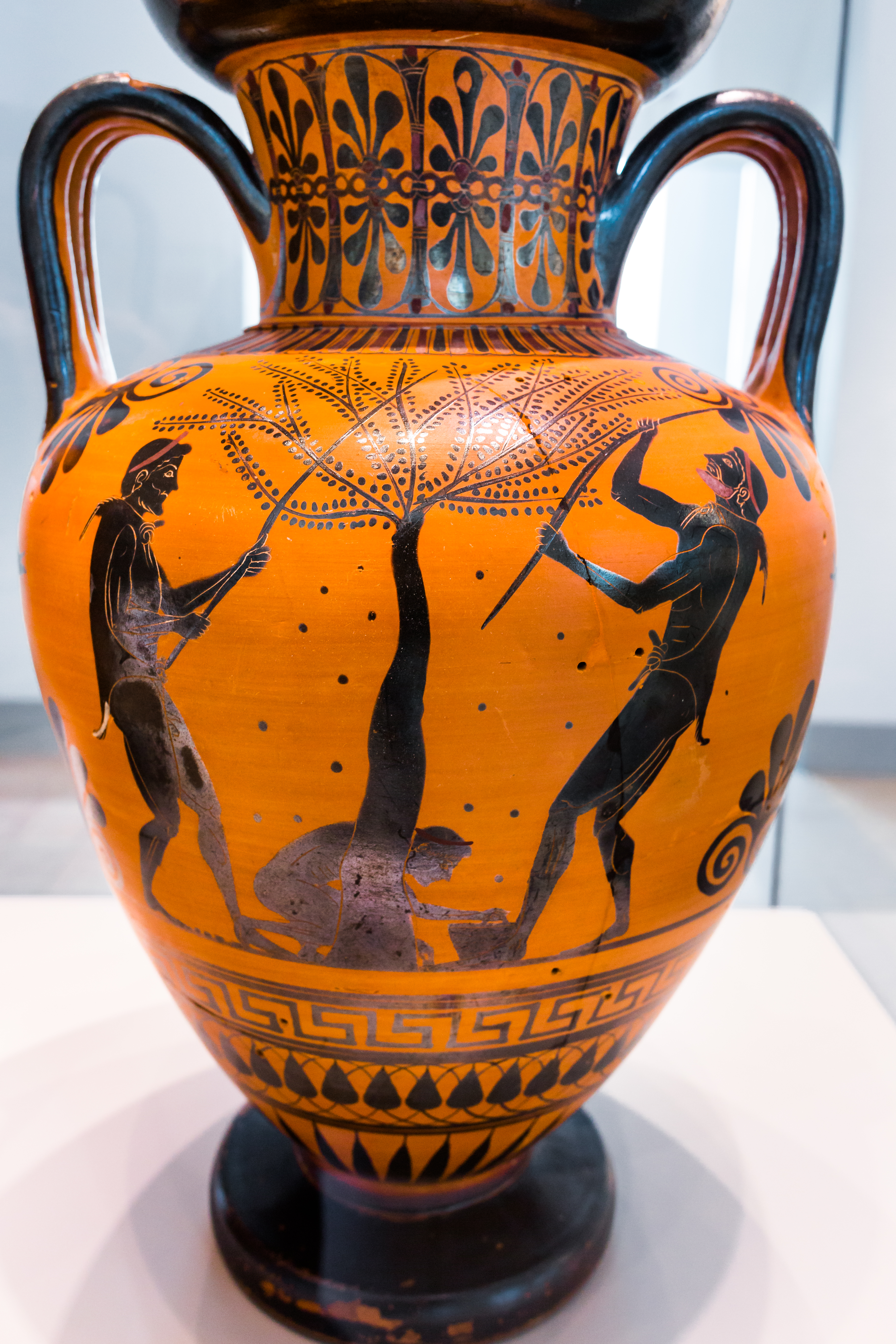
Greek vase showing men gathering olives, by the Antimenes Painter (c. 520–510 BC)

The olive tree and its fruit have widespread symbolic and cultural significance. Researchers and historians have identified the olive as one of the defining characteristics of both ancient and contemporary Mediterranean culture, geography and cuisine. Georges Duhamel remarked that the "Mediterranean ends where the olive tree no longer grows". An olive branch is a symbol of peace.

== See also ==
- Moria (tree)
- Olive leaf
- Olea
