= Mayur (given name) =

Given name

Mayur is a given name. Notable people with the name include:

- Mohit Mayur Jayaprakash (born 1993), Indian tennis player
- Mayur Lakhani (born 1960), British doctor who works as a general practitioner
- Mayur Madhvani (born 1949), Ugandan businessman, entrepreneur, and industrialist of Indian origin
- Naveen Mayur (1978–2010), Indian actor known for his work in Kannada cinema
- Mayur Puri, Indian screenwriter, lyricist, actor and film-maker working in Mumbai
- Mayur Verma (born 1991), Indian television actor known for playing Bunny in Jeannie Aur Juju
- Mayur Vyas, Indian voice actor who does dubbing into Hindi for films and television programs

== See also ==
- Mayur (disambiguation)
