= Mayur Vihar Extension metro station =

Metro station in Delhi, India

Mayur Vihar Extension

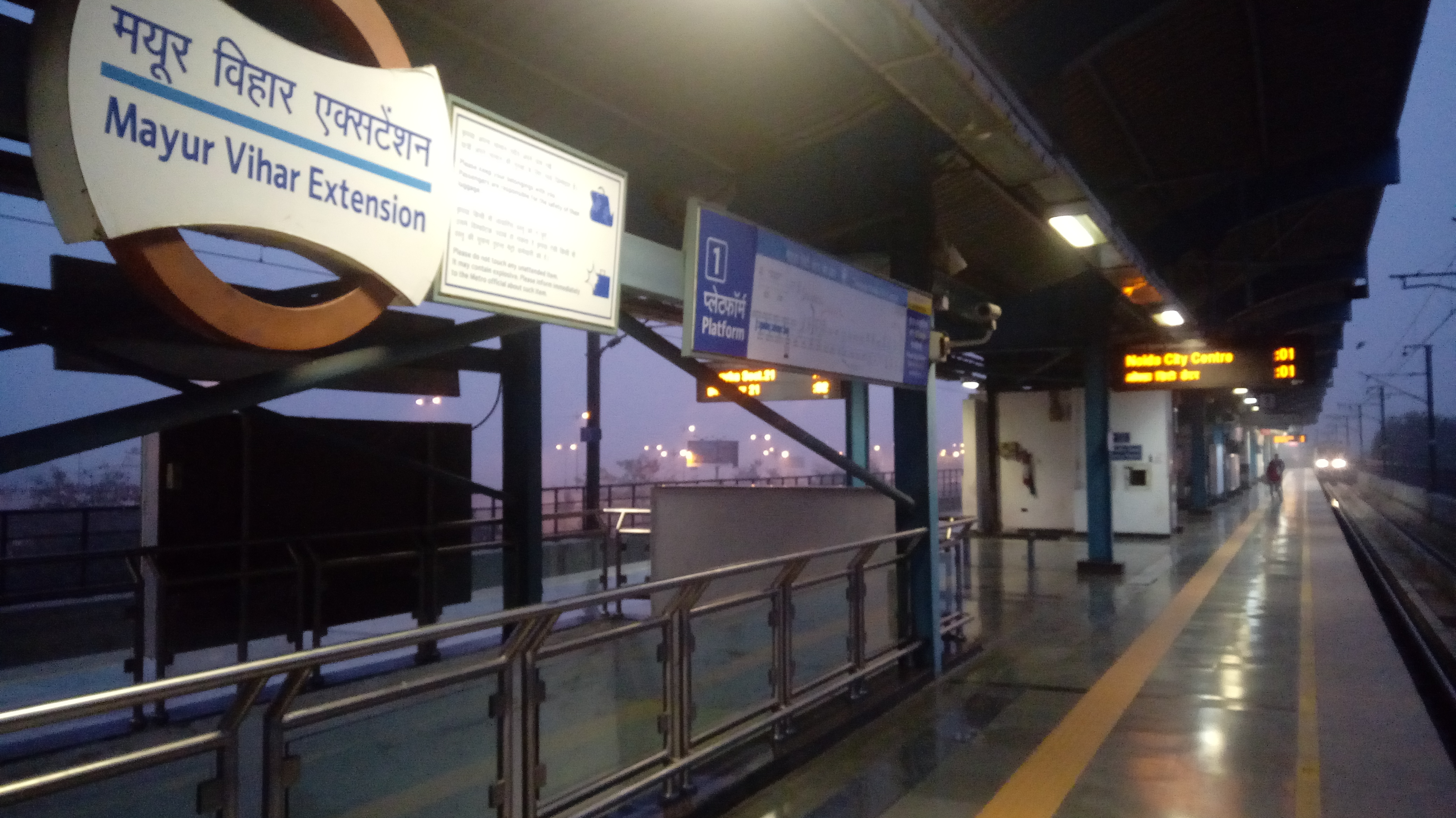

General information
- Location: Club Avn Rd Mayur Vihar Phase-1 Extn New Delhi 110091
- Coordinates: 28°35′39″N 77°17′41″E
- System: Delhi Metro station
- Owner: Delhi Metro Rail Corporation Ltd. (DMRC)
- Line: Blue Line
- Platforms: Island platform; Platform-1 → Noida Electronic City; Platform-2 → Dwarka Sector 21
- Tracks: 2

Construction
- Structure type: Elevated
- Platform levels: 2
- Parking: Available
- Accessible: Yes

Other information
- Station code: MVE

History
- Opened: 12 November 2009; 16 years ago
- Electrified: 25 kV 50 Hz AC through overhead catenary

Passengers
- 2015: Average 5,639/ day 174,798 (Month of January)

Services
Preceding station	Delhi Metro	Following station
Mayur Vihar-I towards Dwarka Sector 21	Blue Line	New Ashok Nagar towards Noida Electronic City
Route map
Location

The Mayur Vihar Extension metro station is located on the Blue Line of the Delhi Metro.

== Station layout ==
P	Platform 1 Southbound	Towards → Noida Electronic City; Next Station: New Ashok Nagar
P	Island platform | Doors will open on the right
P	Platform 2 Northbound	Towards ← Dwarka Sector 21; Next Station: Mayur Vihar-I Change at the next station for Pink Line
C	Concourse	Fare control, station agent, Ticket/token, shops
G	Street level	Exit/Entrance

== Facilities ==
List of available ATM at Mayur Vihar Extension metro station are State Bank of India Canara Bank.

It has also shopping facility of Big Bazaar.

== See also ==
- List of Delhi Metro stations
- Transport in Delhi
- Delhi Metro Rail Corporation
- Delhi Suburban Railway
- List of rapid transit systems in India
