= Takemasa Moriya =

Japanese politician and convicted criminal

- 守屋武昌
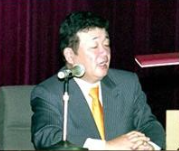
- Moriya at the National Defense Academy of Japan, 2007
- Born: 23 September 1944 (age 82); Shiogama, Miyagi Prefecture, Japan
- Citizenship: Japan
- Education: Tohoku University
- Office: Vice Defense Minister of Japan
- Political party: Liberal Democratic Party
- Criminal charges: Bribery, perjury
- Criminal penalty: 30 months in prison

Takemasa Moriya (守屋武昌, Moriya Takemasa; born 23 September 1944) is a Japanese politician who served as Vice-Minister of Defense at the Ministry of Defense between 2003 and August 2007.

Moriya was implicated of accepting bribes in the Yamada Yoko Incident, and was compelled to sworn testimony before the National Diet. He was sentenced to 30 months in prison over the scandal.

== Background ==
Moriya was born on 23 September 1944, in the city of Shiogama, Miyagi Prefecture, in the Tohoku Region. His father, Hideo Moriya (ja:守屋栄夫), served as Mayor of the city in the prewar period. Moriya graduated from Tohoku University, briefly working for Nippon Express and joined the Defense Ministry in 1971.

== Defense Ministry ==
After becoming involved with the ministry's affairs, Moriya held a series of key posts including becoming the head of the Defense Policy Bureau. Moriya assisted in the renegotiation of the relocation of MCAS Futenma while at the defense ministry.

== Bribery scandal ==
Moriya would become entangled in a major corruption scandal concerning the acquisition of equipment for the Japanese Self Defense Forces. Moriya had significant influence within the Yamada Corporation. Yamada Corporation overcharged Rheinmetall AG on several arms contracts. Yamada offered Moriya and his wife a dozen golf trips collectively worth over 3.9 million yen in exchange for granting favorable defense contracts to several defense trading companies. Law enforcement raided Moriya's home in search of documents Moriya was also compelled to testimony before the diet as a result of the scandal.

The scandal was in conjunction with internal machinations in the cabinet of Yasuo Fukuda. Yuriko Koike, defense minister at time of Moriya's resignation, repeatedly stated her intention to remove Moriya, stating that his tenureship had promoted misalignment and sleaze. Koike blamed leaks in the Defense Ministry and a nascent corruption scandal concerning the acquisition of transport aircraft on Moriya, arguing that his administration of the agency had created "institutional scoliosis"
