= Morea (disambiguation) =

Morea was the name of the Peloponnese peninsula during the Middle Ages.

Morea may also refer to:

== Countries ==
- Principality of Achaea or Principality of Morea (1205–1432/1454)
- Despotate of the Morea (1349–1460)
- Morea Eyalet (1661–1686; 1715–1821)
- Kingdom of the Morea (1688–1715)

== Places ==
- Morea, Illinois, United States
- Morea, Pennsylvania, United States
- Morea (Charlottesville, Virginia), United States, a historic home

== People ==
- Dino Morea (born 1975), Indian model and actor
- Enrique Morea (1924–2017), Argentinian tennis player
- Ipi Morea (born 1975), Papua New Guinean cricketer
- Vani Morea (born 1993), Papua New Guinean cricketer
- Morea Banićević (born 1981), Croatian writer
- Morea Morea (born 2001), Papua New Guinean rugby league footballer

== See also ==
- Moira (disambiguation)
- Moria (disambiguation)
- Moriah (disambiguation)
- Morya (disambiguation)
- Mo'orea
