= León S. Morra =

Argentine physician and politician (1882–1948)

León Sebastián Morra

Mayor of the city of Córdoba, Argentina
- In office July 15, 1918 – July 15, 1921
- Preceded by: Fernando L. Giménez
- Succeeded by: José Agustín Ferreyra
- Constituency: Córdoba

Personal details
- Born: 1882 Córdoba, Argentina
- Died: March 16, 1948 (aged 65–66) Argentina Córdoba, Argentina
- Party: Democratic Party of Argentina
- Occupation: Doctor, teacher

León S. Morra (1882–1948) was an Argentine physician, university professor, and politician. He was born in Córdoba in 1882 and died on March 16, 1948.

== Education and career ==
Morra studied at the National University of Córdoba. There, in 1902, he graduated as a pharmacist and, seven years later, as a surgeon. In 1913, he served as assistant professor of neurology and psychiatry at the Faculty of Medicine, and was also a counselor and head of the department from 1918.

He was mayor of the city of Córdoba, in the period between July 15, 1918, and the same date in 1921. Three years later he became rector of the university, a position he held until 1928, returning to take up the position again from 1945 to 1946. In 1927 he founded the "Las Rosas" sanatorium, which now bears his name, and directed it until his death in the city of Córdoba on March 16, 1948.
