= Minimum off-route altitude =

Aircraft pilot aid

A minimum off-route altitude (MORA) provides a quick way for an aircraft pilot to read the minimum altitude required for terrain and obstacle clearance. MORAs give at least 1,000 feet altitude clearance above terrain and obstacles such as radio masts, and 2,000 feet where the terrain and obstacles exceed 5,000 feet. MORAs are given feet, rounded up to the nearest 100 and omitting the last two figures. For example, 7,550 feet would be given as 76.

There are two types of MORAs: the route MORA and the grid MORA. Route MORAs provide an obstacle clearance within 10 nautical miles (19 km) on both sides of the airways and within a 10-nautical-mile (19 km) radius around the ends of the airways. Grid MORAs provide an obstacle clearance altitude within a latitude and longitude grid block, usually of one degree by one degree.

MORAs were created by Jeppesen and used on their airways charts. Some countries specify Minimum Enroute Altitudes (MEAs), minimum obstruction clearance altitudes (MOCAs), and Off Route Obstacle Clearance Altitudes (OROCAs), which have slightly different rules. An MEA gives a minimum altitude for reception of navigation aids and radio communications, and is found only within controlled airspace. An OROCA gives 2000 feet of clearance only in mountainous areas.
