= Moriah (name) =

Moriah is a feminine given name and a surname. Notable people with the name include:

== Given name ==
- Moriah Jefferson (born 1994), American basketball player
- Moriah van Norman (born 1984), American water polo player
- Moriah Rose Pereira (born 1995), known as Poppy, American singer
- Moriah Smallbone (born 1992), American singer and songwriter
- Moriah Wilson (1996–2022), American pro cyclist

== Surname ==
- Nathan Moriah-Welsh (born 2002), English footballer who plays in the Guyana national team

== Fictional characters ==
- Gecko Moriah, a character in One Piece
