= Moyra =

Moyra is a female given name. Notable people with this name include:

- Moyra Allen (1921–1996), Canadian nurse
- Moyra Barry (1886–1960), Irish artist
- Moyra Browne (1918–2016), British nurse
- Moyra Caldecott (1927–2015), British author
- Moyra Davey (born 1958), American artist
- Moyra Donaldson (born 1956), Northern Irish author
- Moyra Fraser (1923–2009), Australian-born English actress
- Moyra Hiscox (born 1937), British middle-distance runner
