= Moria (tree) =

Olive trees with religious significance in Ancient Greece

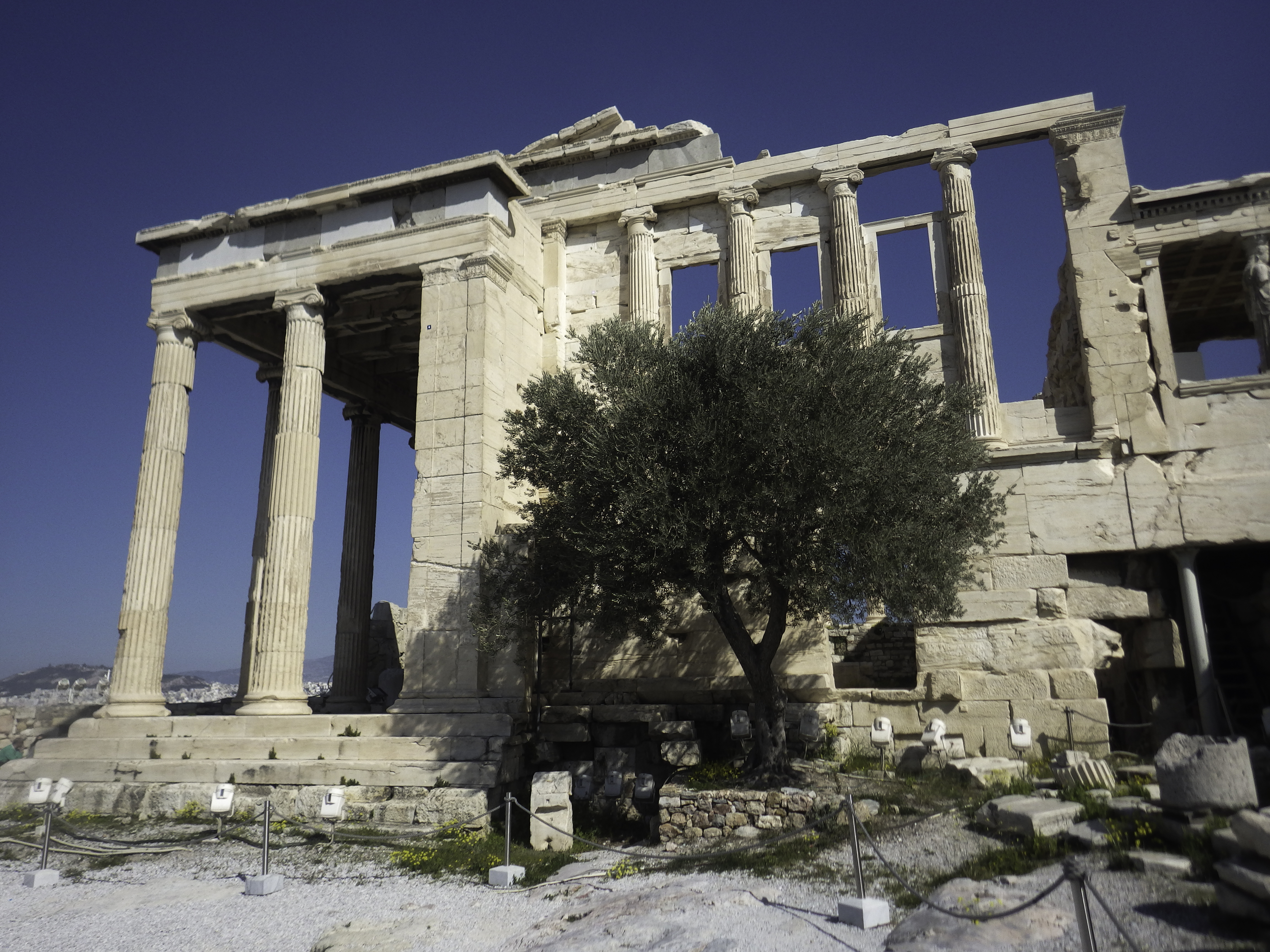
The most sacred moria tree stands in front of the ancient temple of Erechtheion on the Acropolis of Athens, Greece. Thought to be the same location of the first olive tree given to Athens by the Greek goddess Athena.

In ancient Greece, the moriai (plural of moria) were olive trees considered to be the property of the state because of their religious significance.

== Overview ==
From Attic Orators, vol. I. p. 289:

Throughout Attica, besides the olives which were private property (ἴδιαι ἐλαῖαι, Lys. or. 7 § 10) there were others which, whether on public or on private lands, were considered as the property of the State. They were called "moriae" (μορίαι), the legend being that they had been propagated (μεμορημέναι) from the original olive which Athena herself had caused to spring up on the Acropolis. This theory was convenient for their conservation as State property, since, by giving them a sacred character, it placed them directly under the care of the Areiopagus, which caused them to be visited once a month by Inspectors (ἐπιμεληταί, Lys. or. 7 § 29), and once a year by special Commissioners (γνώμονες, ib. § 25). To uproot a moria was an offence punishable by banishment and confiscation of goods (ib. § 41).

From Moriai: Sacred Arboriculture in Athens:

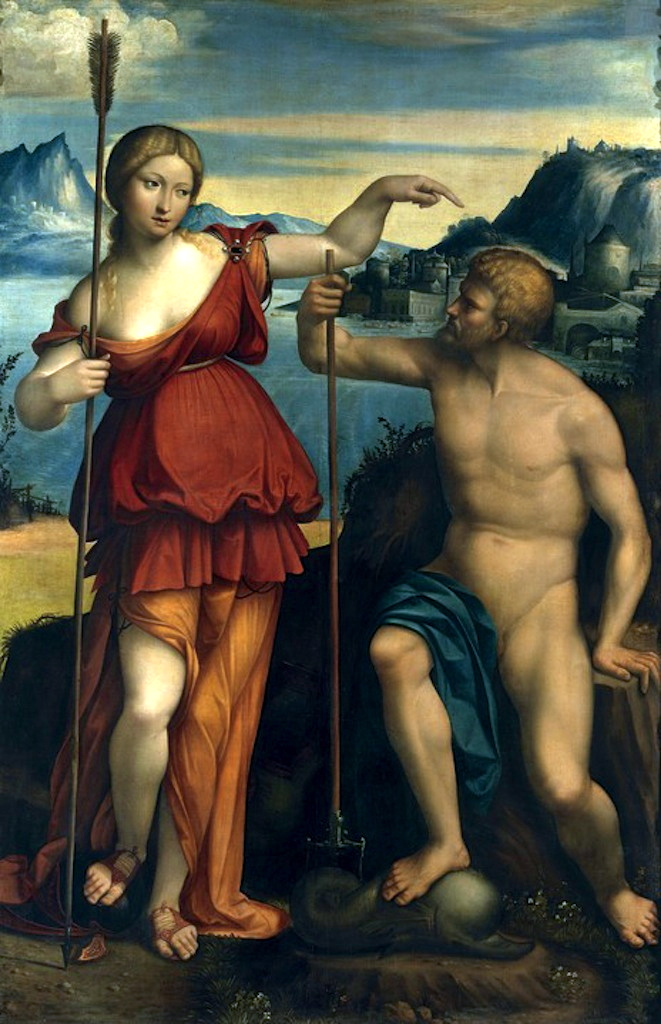
Poseidon and Athena battle for control of Attica (Athens)

Athena's gift to her protégés was the olive she planted on the sacred rock of the Acropolis. From this primordial olive twelve new trees were transplanted in the sanctuary of the hero Akademos and comprised a sacred grove. These trees, we are told by our ancient sources, were called moriai. The etymology remains obscure, but the most compelling explanation is the connection of the word moria with the stem μερ, which bears the meaning "to be part of"; the moriai were part of Athena's property.

== Mythical origin ==
=== Contest for Attica (Athens) ===
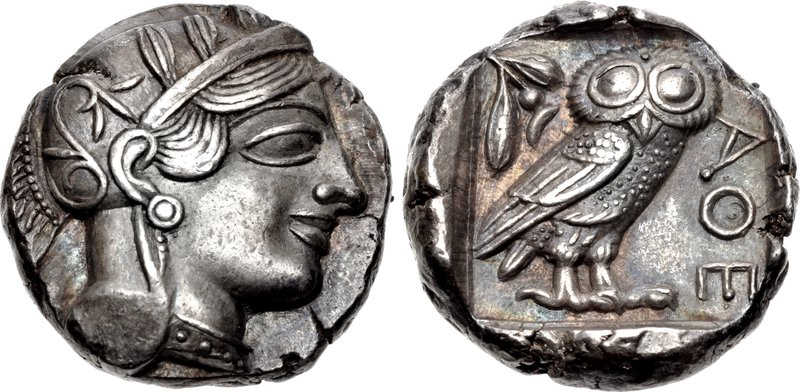
Athenian Tetradrachm coins: Helmeted head of Athena (left), Owl with an olive sprig (right)

According to Greek mythology, upon his establishment of the newly founded city (polis) of Attica, king Cecrops desired to appoint a patron deity and protector over his new city. Poseidon (Olympic god of the sea, earthquakes, and horses) and Athena (Olympic goddess of wisdom, craft, and war) both desired to lay claim to the ancient Greek city. Appearing before king Cecrops and a gathering of the people of Attica on the Acropolis, it was decided that a contest between the two powerful Olympians would be held. Whoever could bestow the more useful gift to the people of Attica would be declared patron deity and have the city named in his/her honor. Poseidon was the first to present his gift; striking a rock with a powerful blow of his trident, a spring of salt water burst through. Athena came next; as she thrust her spear into the ground of the Acropolis, she knelt down and planted an olive branch in the hole, which quickly grew into Greece's first moria (olive) tree. King Cecrops and the people of Attica deliberated the usefulness of the gifts. Poseidon's spring made of salt water was not suitable for drinking or much else, yet Athena's precious gift proved to be suitable for an abundance of purposes. Athena was hailed winner of the competition and was crowned patron goddess and protector of the city (polis) of Attica, whose people adopted the name Athens in her honor.

From Olive Oil Times, Laura Aitken-Burt writes:

The Athenians chose Athena's gift and the olive tree has remained a central part of Greek life ever since for all of its profound qualities. The leaves have been used to crown the heads of victorious athletes, generals and kings, the wood used to construct houses and boats, the oil used to give fuel to lamps, rubbed into the toned, muscled bodies of lithe athletes, added to all food dishes and the olives themselves—a staple in the Mediterranean diet and a valuable export throughout antiquity and today. Even the iconic Athenian tetradrachm coins had the leaves of the olive branch peeping to the left of Athena's owl.
