= Cistanche tubulosa =

- Detail of Arabian beach habitat diorama showing Cistanche tubulosa and halophytic plants by Sebastian Brandt

Scientific classification
- Kingdom: Plantae
- Clade: Tracheophytes
- Clade: Angiosperms
- Clade: Eudicots
- Clade: Asterids
- Order: Lamiales
- Family: Orobanchaceae
- Genus: Cistanche
- Species: C. tubulosa

Binomial name
- Cistanche tubulosa (Schrenk) Hook.f.

Species of flowering plant

Cistanche tubulosa is a desert heterotrophic species in the genus Cistanche. It lacks chlorophyll and obtains nutrients and water from the host plants whose roots it parasitizes.

== Uses ==
The plant is grown in the Taklamakan Desert, and is traditionally used for medicines and foods in China.

The main sources of the Chinese herbal medicine cistanche (Chinese: 肉苁蓉, pinyin ròucōngróng) are Cistanche salsa and Cistanche deserticola, although it may also be obtained from C. tubulosa. The drug, known in Chinese as suosuo dayun, is collected in spring before sprouting, by slicing the stems of the plant.

== Pharmacology ==
Echinacoside and acteoside has been found in Cistanche tubulosa
