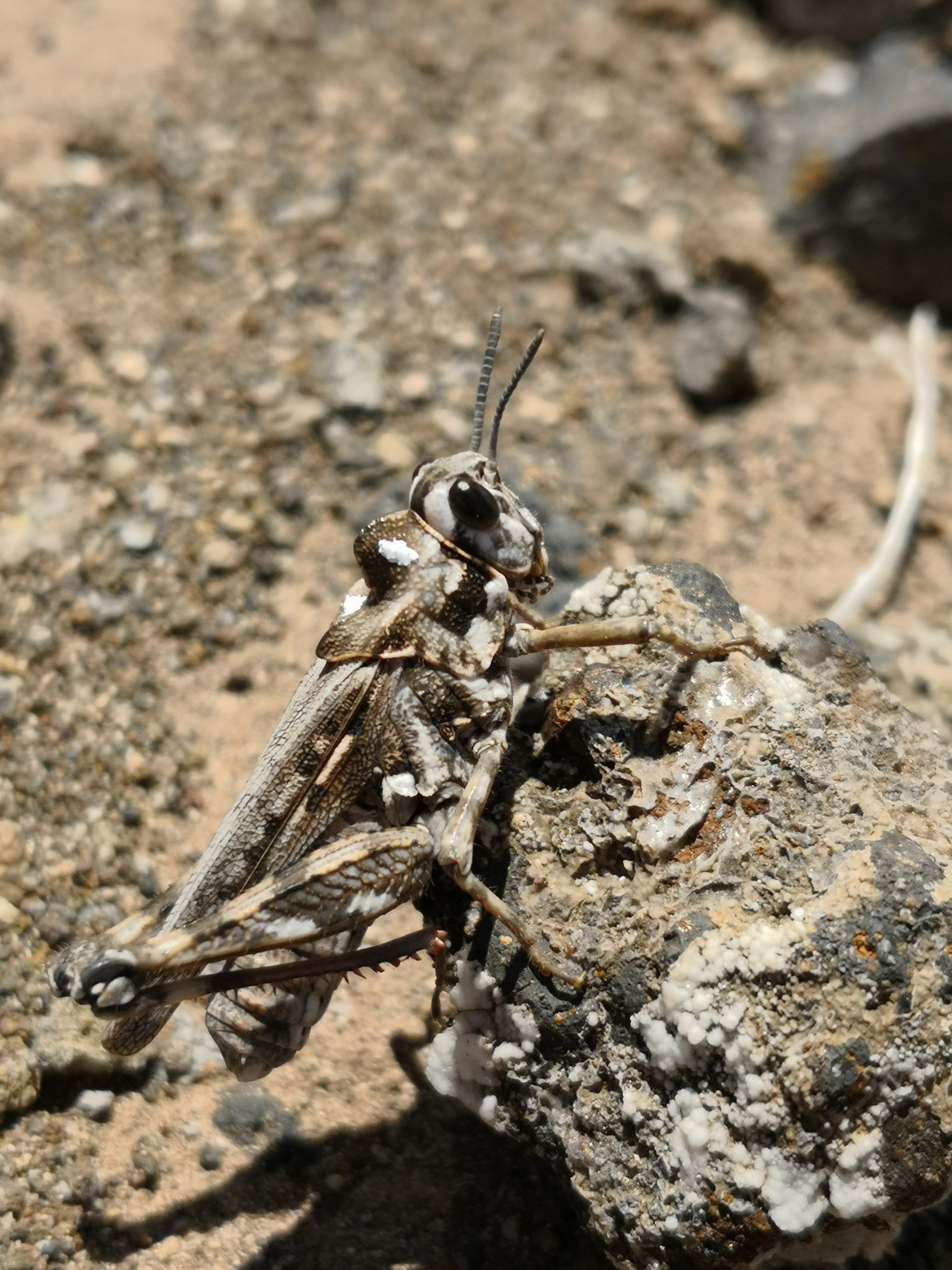

Conservation status
- Critically Endangered (IUCN 3.1)

Scientific classification
- Kingdom: Animalia
- Phylum: Arthropoda
- Clade: Pancrustacea
- Class: Insecta
- Order: Orthoptera
- Suborder: Caelifera
- Family: Dericorythidae
- Genus: Dericorys
- Species: D. minutus

Binomial name
- Dericorys minutus (Chopard, 1954)

= Maspalomas bow-legged grasshopper =

Species of grasshopper

The Maspalomas bow-legged grasshopper (Dericorys minutus) is a species of grasshopper of the family Acrididae. The species was once thought to be endemic to the town of Maspalomas on Gran Canaria Island but a second population was found in the north of Gran Canaria. The species hasn't been found around Maspalomas since 1949. It is considered Critically endangered, or almost extinct.
