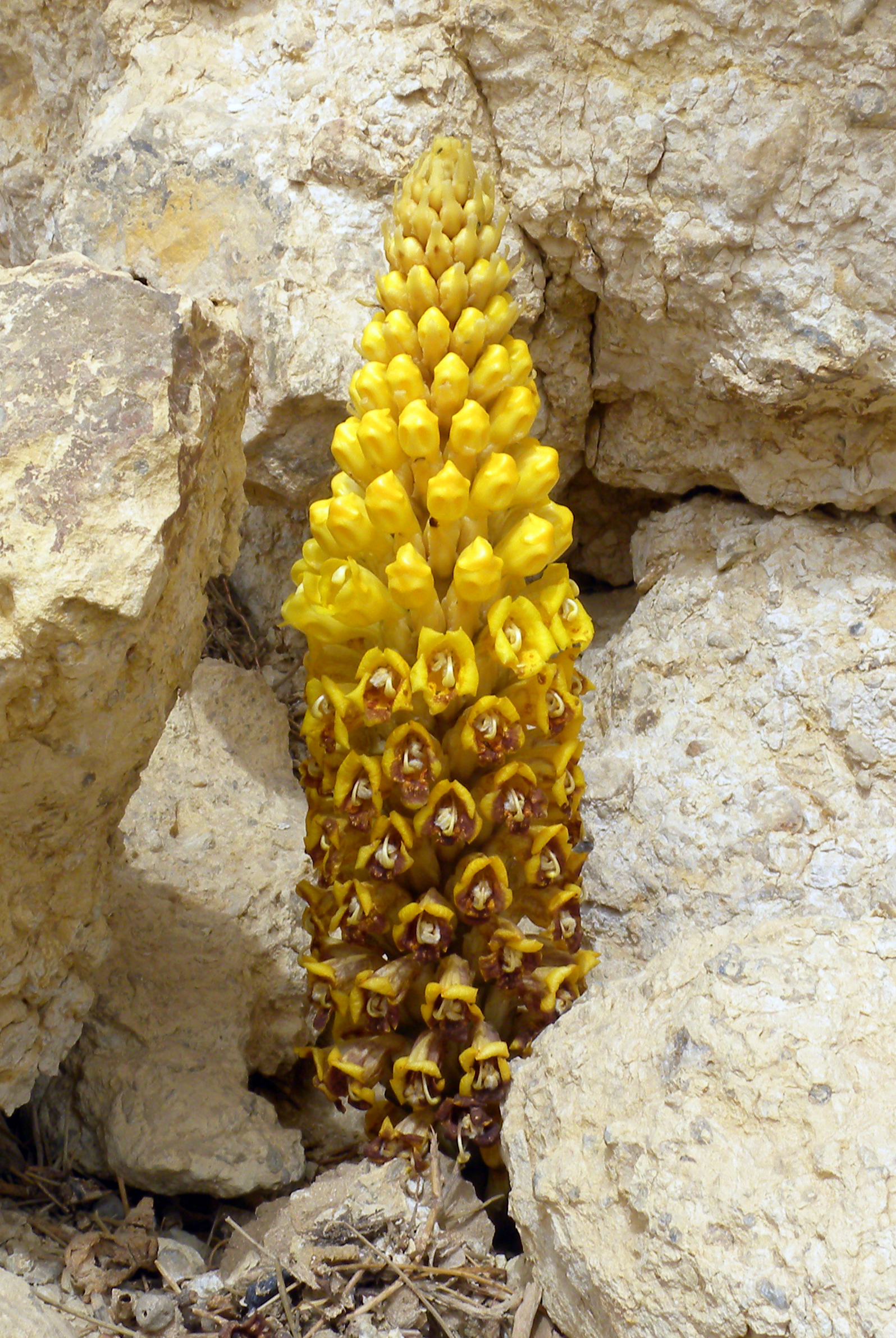
- Cistanche tubulosa

Scientific classification
- Kingdom: Plantae
- Clade: Tracheophytes
- Clade: Angiosperms
- Clade: Eudicots
- Clade: Asterids
- Order: Lamiales
- Family: Orobanchaceae
- Tribe: Orobancheae
- Genus: Cistanche

Species
- See Text

Synonyms
- Haemodoron Rchb. 1828

= Cistanche =

Genus of flowering plants in the broomrape family

Cistanche is a Eurasian and African genus of holoparasitic desert plants in the family Orobanchaceae. They lack chlorophyll and obtain nutrients and water from the host plants whose roots they parasitize. They are often known as desert hyacinths.

== Taxonomy ==
There are between 20 and 30 species of Cistanche. The most comprehensive description of the genus was published in 1930. The taxonomy is difficult because important features of the flowers are often poorly preserved after drying. The plants are found from the Mediterranean region, North Africa, Middle East through to China. The species of Cistanche are parasitic plants that connect to the conductive system of a host, extracting water and nutrients from the roots of the host plant.

=== Species ===
Species as according to Plants of the World Online as of January 2024:

Image	Scientific name	Distribution
	Cistanche aethiopica Beck	NW. Ethiopia
	Cistanche afghanica Gilli	SE. Afghanistan
	Cistanche armena (K.Koch) M.V.Agab.	Transcaucasus
	Cistanche christisonioides Beck	Pakistan
	Cistanche compacta (Viv.) Bég. & A.Vacc.	NE. Libya
	Cistanche deserticola Ma	China (Inner Mongolia, Xinjiang), Mongolia
	Cistanche feddeana K.S.Hao	Mongolia, China (Sichuan)
	Cistanche fissa (C.A.Mey.) Beck	Israel to Central Asia
	Cistanche flava (C.A.Mey.) Korsh.	Iran, Kazakhstan, Tadzhikistan, Turkmenistan, Uzbekistan
	Cistanche lanzhouensis Z.Y.Zhang	E. & S. Mongolia to N. China.
	Cistanche laxiflora Aitch. & Hemsl.	Afghanistan, Iran
	Cistanche lutea (Desf.) Hoffmanns. & Link	Algeria, Morocco, Oman, Spain
	Cistanche mauritanica (Coss. & Durieu) Beck	Algeria, Morocco
	Cistanche mongolica Beck	Kazakhstan, Mongolia, Tadzhikistan, Uzbekistan, China (Xinjiang)
	Cistanche phelypaea (L.) Cout.	Algeria, Benin, Canary Is., Cape Verde, Chad, Cyprus, Egypt, Italy, Kriti, Libya, Mali, Mauritania, Morocco, Niger, Portugal, Selvagens, Senegal, Spain, Sudan, Tunisia, Western Sahara
	Cistanche ridgewayana Aitch. & Hemsl.	Afghanistan, Iran, Tadzhikistan, Turkmenistan, Uzbekistan
	Cistanche rosea Baker	Oman, Saudi Arabia, Yemen
	Cistanche salsa (C.A.Mey.) Beck	Afghanistan, China (Xinjiang, Inner Mongolia), Russia, Iran, Iraq, Kazakhstan, Kirgizstan, Mongolia, Qinghai, Tadzhikistan, Transcaucasus, Turkey, Turkmenistan, Uzbekistan
	Cistanche sinensis Beck	China (Inner Mongolia, Xinjiang)
	Cistanche speciosa Butkov	Uzbekistan
	Cistanche stenostachya Butkov	Uzbekistan
	Cistanche trivalvis (Trautv.) Korsh.	Turkmenistan
	Cistanche tubulosa (Schenk) Wight ex Hook.f.	Afghanistan, Chad, Djibouti, Egypt, Eritrea, Ethiopia, Gulf States, India, Iran, Iraq, Kazakhstan, Kenya, Kuwait, Lebanon-Syria, Libya, Mozambique, Oman, Pakistan, Palestine, Saudi Arabia, Sinai, Socotra, Somalia, Sudan, Tanzania, Turkmenistan, Yemen
	Cistanche violacea (Desf.) Hoffmanns. & Link	Algeria, Chad, Lebanon-Syria, Libya, Mauritania, Morocco, Palestine, Saudi Arabia, Sinai, Tunisia, Western Sahara

== Growth ==
They typically grow in desert or sand dune areas Growing in arid regions, where their flower spikes that emerge from bare ground are the only evidence of the presence of the plants. They do not have leaves and do not perform photosynthesis.

Some species of Cistanche are native to the Taklimakan desert region of Xinjiang Uyghur Autonomous Region northwest China where they grow on desert host plants tamarix and Haloxylon ammodendron.

== Uses ==
Along with other members of the genus, Cistanche deserticola is the primary source of the Chinese herbal medicine cistanche (Chinese: 肉苁蓉; pinyin: ròucōngróng). The main sources of cistanche are Cistanche salsa and Cistanche deserticola, although it may also be obtained from Cistanche tubulosa, Cistanche sinensis, and Cistanche ambigua. The drug, known in Chinese as suosuo dayun, is collected in spring before sprouting, by slicing the stems of the plant. Cistanche deserticola has been placed on CITES Appendix 2, a list of endangered species not banned from trade but requiring monitoring. With increased consumption of cistanche, the population of the species has decreased and its area of distribution has shrunk. Aside from over-collection or indiscriminate collection, an important factor in the diminished supply of cistanche is a loss of the host, Haloxylon ammodendron, which is widely used for firewood.
