= Conophyma =

Scientific classification
- Domain: Eukaryota
- Kingdom: Animalia
- Phylum: Arthropoda
- Class: Insecta
- Order: Orthoptera
- Suborder: Caelifera
- Family: Dericorythidae
- Subfamily: Conophyminae
- Genus: Conophyma; Zubovski, 1898

Synonyms
- Pamiracris Ramme, 1930; Thaumatophyma Ramme, 1939

Genus of grasshoppers

Conophyma is the type genus of grasshoppers of the subfamily Conophyminae and tribe Conophymini. Species are recorded from central Asia.

== Species ==
The Orthoptera Species File lists:

1. Conophyma alajense Mistshenko, 1951
2. Conophyma almasyi (Kuthy, 1905)
3. Conophyma amicus Li & Ti, 1995
4. Conophyma argutum Mistshenko, 1950
5. Conophyma armatum Mistshenko, 1950
6. Conophyma bactrianum Mistshenko, 1950
7. Conophyma badium Mistshenko, 1950
8. Conophyma baludzhianum Mistshenko, 1946
9. Conophyma berezhkovi Bey-Bienko, 1948
10. Conophyma beybienkoi Mistshenko, 1937
11. Conophyma bogojavlenskii Tarbinsky, 1926
12. Conophyma boldyrevi Bey-Bienko, 1948
13. Conophyma cercatum (Ramme, 1939)
14. Conophyma comatum Mistshenko, 1951
15. Conophyma comtulum Mistshenko, 1950
16. Conophyma corallipes (Ramme, 1939)
17. Conophyma darvazicum Mistshenko, 1950
18. Conophyma dirshi Bey-Bienko, 1948
19. Conophyma dumale Mistshenko, 1950
20. Conophyma egregium Mistshenko, 1950
21. Conophyma excellens Mistshenko, 1950
22. Conophyma formosum Mistshenko, 1951
23. Conophyma fuscum Mistshenko, 1950
24. Conophyma geminum Mistshenko, 1950
25. Conophyma ghilarovi Chernyakhovskij, 1985
26. Conophyma ghilarovianum Myrzaliev, 1988
27. Conophyma hejinensis Zhang, Xu & Zhang, 2015
28. Conophyma herbaceum Mistshenko, 1951
29. Conophyma ikonnikovi Uvarov, 1925
30. Conophyma iliense Mistshenko, 1951
31. Conophyma indicum Mistshenko, 1950
32. Conophyma jacobsoni Uvarov, 1925
33. Conophyma jakovlevi Bey-Bienko, 1936
34. Conophyma kashmiricum Mistshenko, 1950
35. Conophyma kusnezovi Umnov, 1931
36. Conophyma latifrons Naumovich, 1986
37. Conophyma laudanense Mistshenko, 1950
38. Conophyma leve Mistshenko, 1951
39. Conophyma lobulatum Mistshenko, 1950
40. Conophyma maracandicum Mistshenko, 1950
41. Conophyma mirabile Mistshenko, 1950
42. Conophyma miramae Uvarov, 1925
43. Conophyma mistshenkoi Protsenko, 1951
44. Conophyma mitchelli Uvarov, 1921
45. Conophyma montanum Chernyakhovskij, 1985
46. Conophyma nanum Mistshenko, 1951
47. Conophyma narzikulovi Cejchan, 1961
48. Conophyma nazarovae Pokivailov & Khayrov, 2020
49. Conophyma nigrescens Mistshenko, 1950
50. Conophyma nigrifemora Zhang, Xu & Zhang, 2015
51. Conophyma nigripes Naumovich, 1986
52. Conophyma nitens Mistshenko, 1951
53. Conophyma oliva Huang, 2006
54. Conophyma olsufjevi Mistshenko, 1937
55. Conophyma pavlovskii Tarbinsky, 1955
56. Conophyma pazukii Mirzayans, 1991
57. Conophyma petrosum Mistshenko, 1950
58. Conophyma plotnikovi Uvarov, 1927
59. Conophyma poimazaricum Sergeev & Pokivajlov, 1997
60. Conophyma prasinum Mistshenko, 1950
61. Conophyma pravdini Stolyarov, 1968
62. Conophyma predtetshenskyi Mistshenko, 1937
63. Conophyma przewalskii Bey-Bienko, 1949
64. Conophyma pylnovi Uvarov, 1925
65. Conophyma reinigi (Ramme, 1930)
66. Conophyma remaudieri Descamps & Donskoff, 1965
67. Conophyma roberti Pfadt, 1987
68. Conophyma rufitibia Li & Ti, 1995
69. Conophyma saxatile Mistshenko, 1950
70. Conophyma semenovi Zubovski, 1898 - type species (C. semenovi semenovi)
71. Conophyma septuosum Mistshenko, 1950
72. Conophyma serafimi Myrzaliev, 1988
73. Conophyma shamonini Shumakov, 1963
74. Conophyma sharafii Pfadt, 1987
75. Conophyma shumakovi Naumovich, 1986
76. Conophyma simile Zubovski, 1899
77. Conophyma sogdianum Mistshenko, 1950
78. Conophyma sokolovi Zubovski, 1899
79. Conophyma speciosum Mistshenko, 1951
80. Conophyma spectabile Sergeev, 1984
81. Conophyma splendidum Mistshenko, 1950
82. Conophyma stebaevi Sergeev, 1986
83. Conophyma susinganicum Mistshenko, 1951
84. Conophyma tarbinskyi Miram, 1931
85. Conophyma transiliense Naumovich, 1978
86. Conophyma tumidum Mistshenko, 1950
87. Conophyma turcomanum Mistshenko, 1950
88. Conophyma turkestanicum Sergeev, 1984
89. Conophyma umnovi Bey-Bienko, 1948
90. Conophyma uvarovi Semenov, 1915
91. Conophyma validum Mistshenko, 1950
92. Conophyma vavilovi Bey-Bienko, 1963
93. Conophyma virgatum Mistshenko, 1951
94. Conophyma weberi Zubovski, 1899
95. Conophyma xerophilum Mistshenko, 1951
96. Conophyma xiai Zhang, Xu & Zhang, 2015
97. Conophyma xinjiangensis Huang, 1982
98. Conophyma zachvatkini Pravdin, 1970
99. Conophyma zhaosuensis Huang, 1982
100. Conophyma zimini Bey-Bienko, 1948
101. Conophyma zubovskyi Uvarov, 1925
