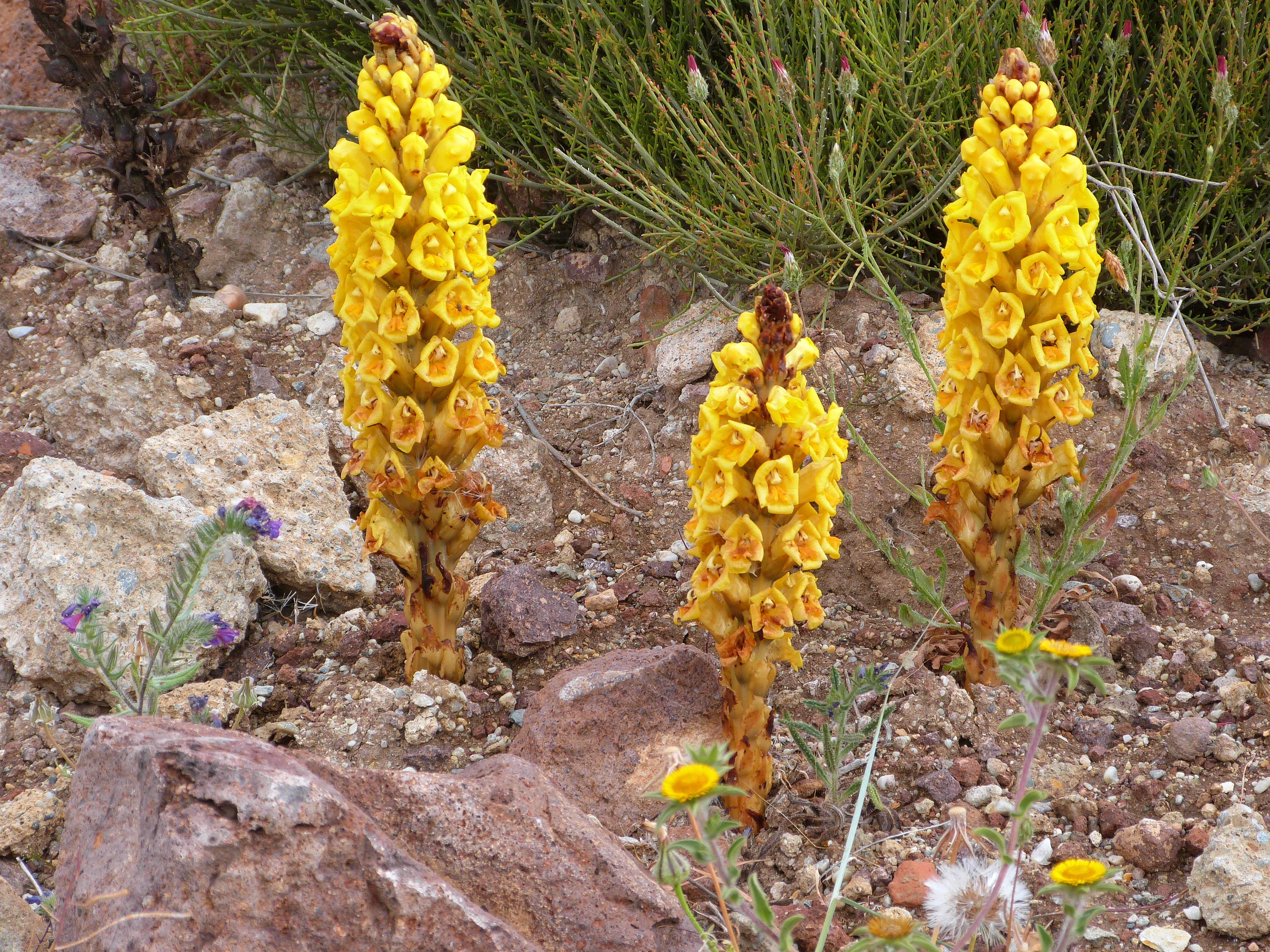

Scientific classification
- Kingdom: Plantae
- Clade: Tracheophytes
- Clade: Angiosperms
- Clade: Eudicots
- Clade: Asterids
- Order: Lamiales
- Family: Orobanchaceae
- Genus: Cistanche
- Species: C. phelypaea

Binomial name
- Cistanche phelypaea (L.) Cout.

= Cistanche phelypaea =

Species of flowering plant

Cistanche phelypaea, also spelled Cistanche phelipaea, is a species of plant in the family Orobanchaceae. It has a wide range of distribution from the Arabian Peninsula and the Syrian Desert in the east, through the Sahara, Cyprus, Crete and the southwest of the Iberian Peninsula, to Macaronesia in the west.

== Description ==
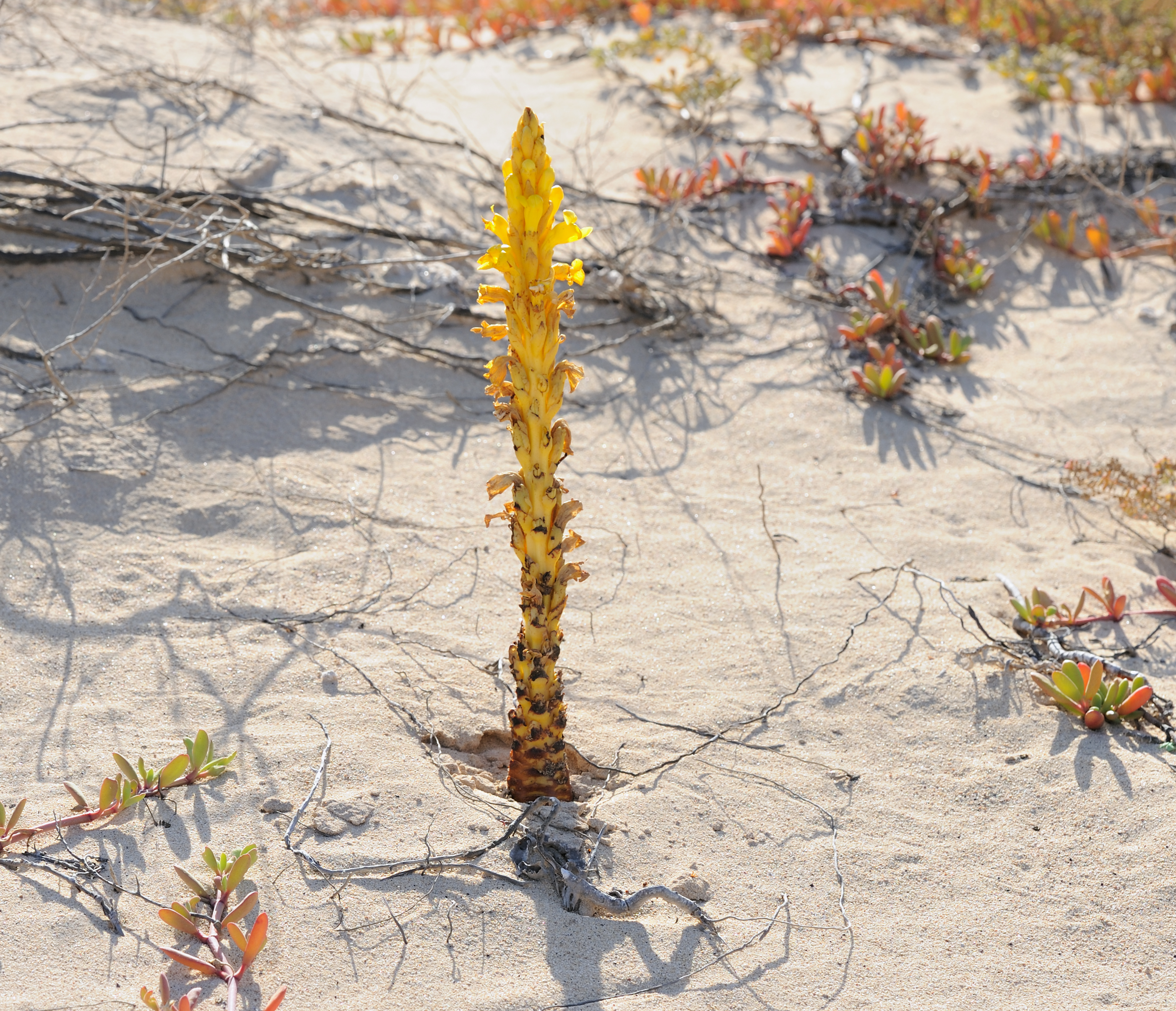
Cistanche phelypaea

Cistanche phelypaea is a chlorophyll-free, obligate parasitic plant with stout fleshy flowering stems bearing bright yellow flowers and rising to 20–50 cm (7.9–19.7 in) tall from a generally swollen base. The stem is glabrous and yellow to purple gray. Leaves are ovate-lanceolate, obtuse, glabrous and normally brown in color. Inflorescence is dense, more or less cylindrical. Flower crown is broadly campanulate-obconic, strongly curved, bright yellow, sometimes light purple, and glabrous. It has white stigmatic lobes. 2n = 40; n = 20. It parasites roots of Chenopodiaceae bushes. The plant is used a food source and is eaten similar to asparagus.

== Distribution and habitat ==
Cistanche phelypaea inhabits saline, sandy, mainly coastal zones but also inland sites from sea level up to 600 m (2,000 ft) altitude. In West Asia it occupies Syria, Saudi Arabia, Qatar, Oman, Yemen, Soqotra; in Africa, Djibouti, Ethiopia, Eritrea, Sudan, Egypt, Chad, Libya, Niger, Algeria, Tunisia, Mali, Senegal, Mauritania, Western Sahara, Morocco; in Southern Europe, Cyprus, Crete, Spain, Portugal; in Macaronesia, Cape Verde, Canary Islands, Savage Islands and Madeira. It has also been introduced in Mozambique and France.

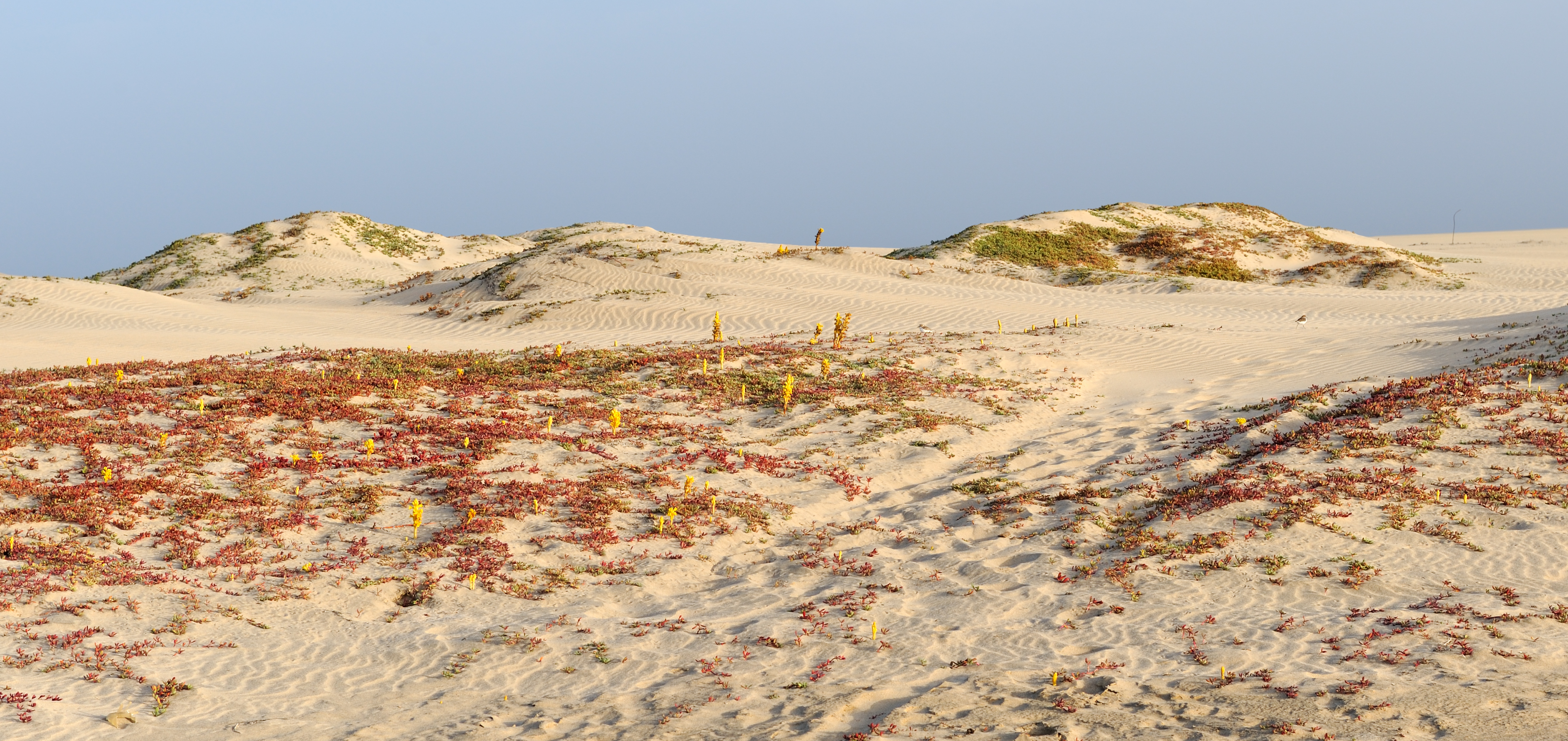
Cistanche phelypaea in Cape Verde

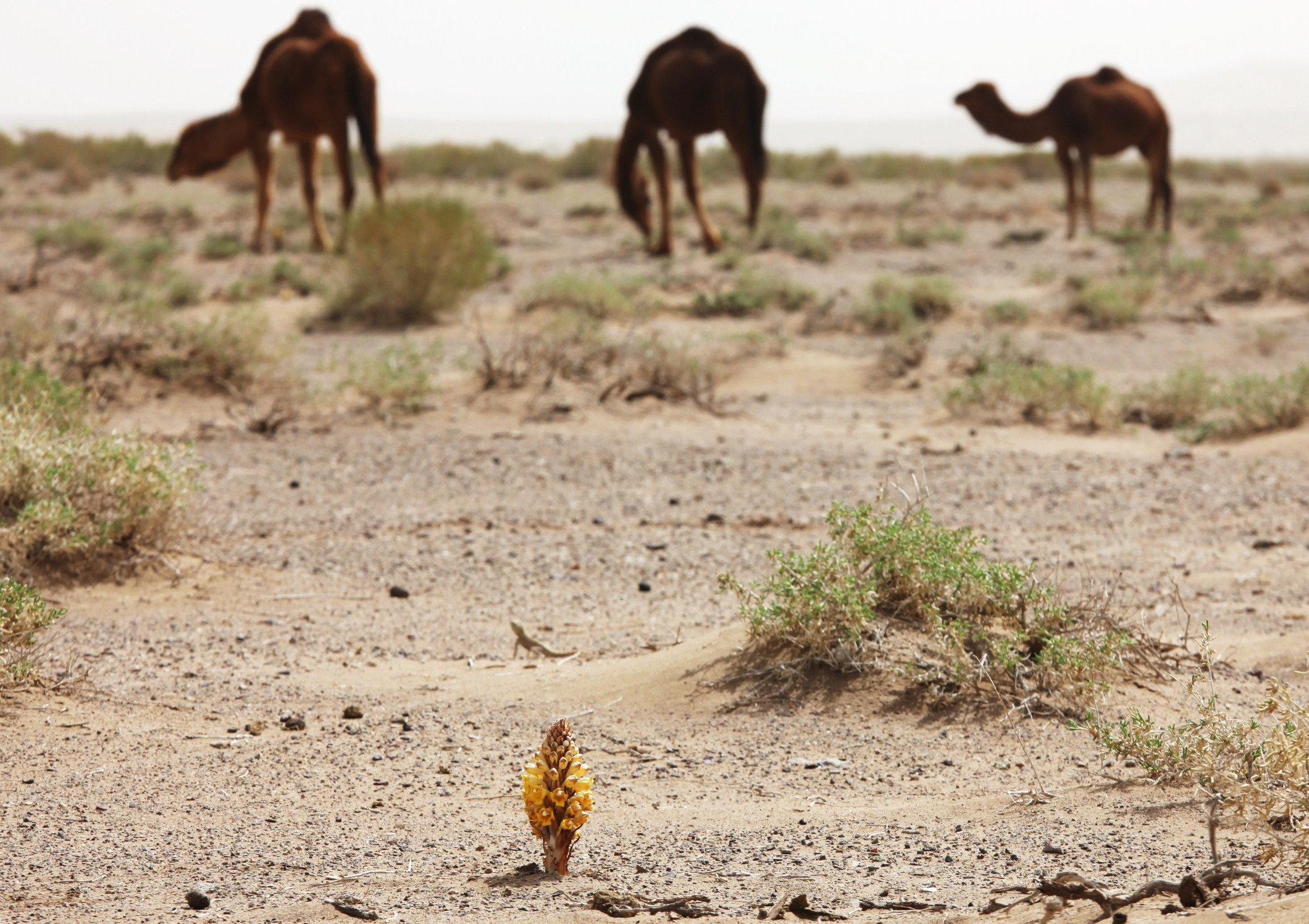
Cistanche phelypaea in Iran
