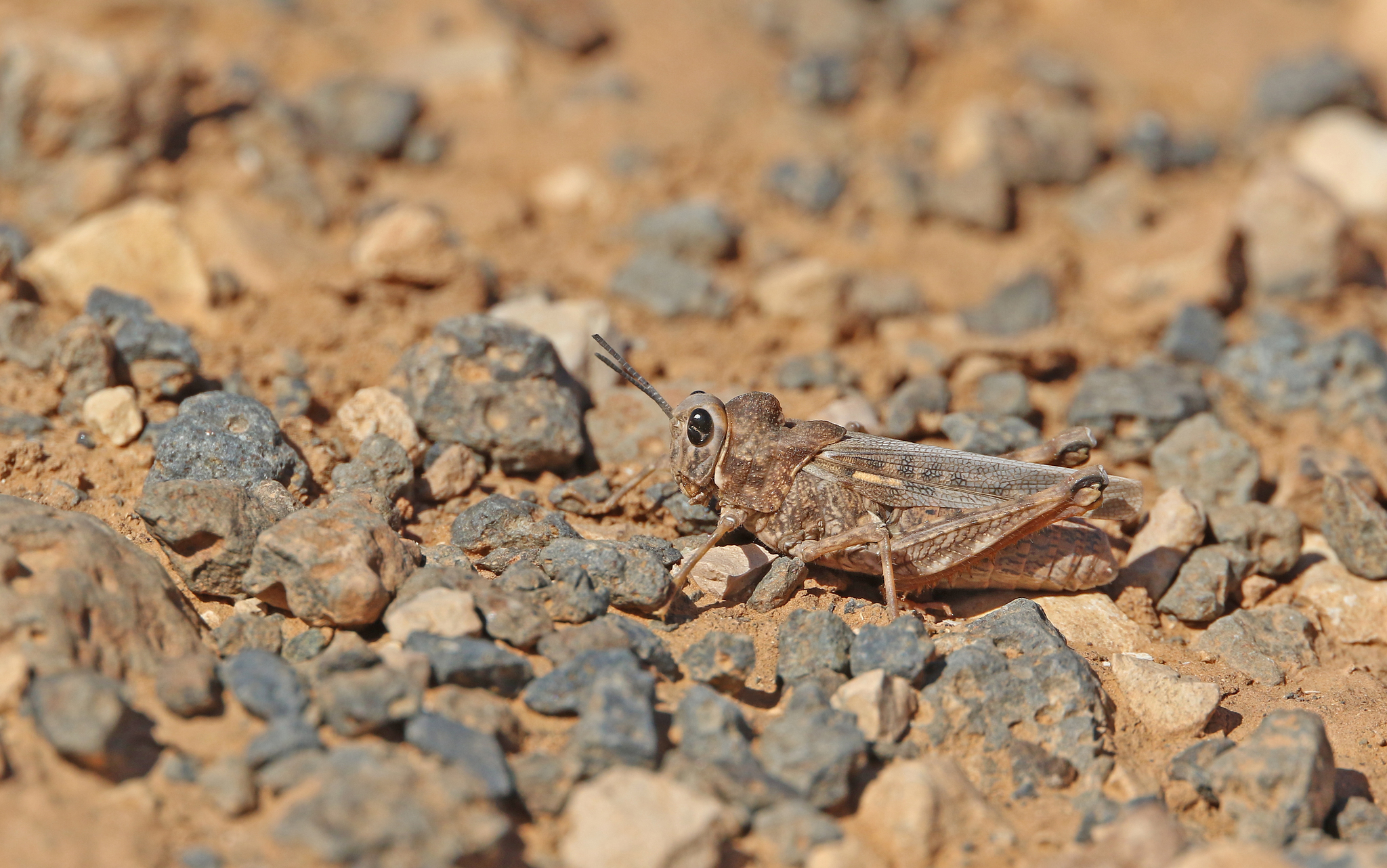
- Dericorys lobata

Scientific classification
- Domain: Eukaryota
- Kingdom: Animalia
- Phylum: Arthropoda
- Class: Insecta
- Order: Orthoptera
- Suborder: Caelifera
- Superfamily: Acridoidea
- Family: Dericorythidae; Jacobson & Bianchi, 1905

= Dericorythidae =

Family of grasshoppers

Dericorythidae are a family of grasshoppers, in the Orthoptera: suborder Caelifera. Species in this family can be found in northern Africa, southern Europe and Asia.

== Subfamilies and Genera ==
The Orthoptera Species File lists:

=== Conophyminae ===
Authority: Mishchenko 1952

tribe Conophymini Mistshenko, 1952

1. Conophyma Zubovski, 1898
2. Conophymopsis Huang, 1983
3. Tarbinskia Mishchenko, 1950

tribe unassigned

1. Bienkoa Mishchenko, 1950
2. Conophymacris Willemse, 1933
3. Khayyamia Koçak, 1981
4. Plotnikovia Umnov, 1930
5. Zagrosia Descamps, 1967

=== Dericorythinae ===
Authority: Jacobson & V.L. Bianchi 1902–1905

1. Anamesacris Uvarov, 1934
2. Bolivaremia Morales-Agacino, 1949
3. Dericorys Serville, 1838
4. Farsinella Bei-Bienko, 1948
5. Pamphagulus Uvarov, 1929

=== Iranellinae ===
Authority: Mishchenko 1952

1. Iranella Uvarov, 1922
2. Iraniobia Bei-Bienko, 1954
3. Iraniola Bei-Bienko, 1954
