= Zenaida Alexandrovna Minkwitz =

Russian botanist (1878–1918)

- Born: 1878
- Died: 1918 (aged 39–40)
- Scientific career
- Fields: Botany

Zenaida Alexandrovna von Minkwitz (Зинаида Александровна фон Минквиц) (1878–1918) was a Russian botanist noted for her study of the flora of Kazakhstan.

The standard author abbreviation Minkw. is used to indicate this person as the author when citing a botanical name.
