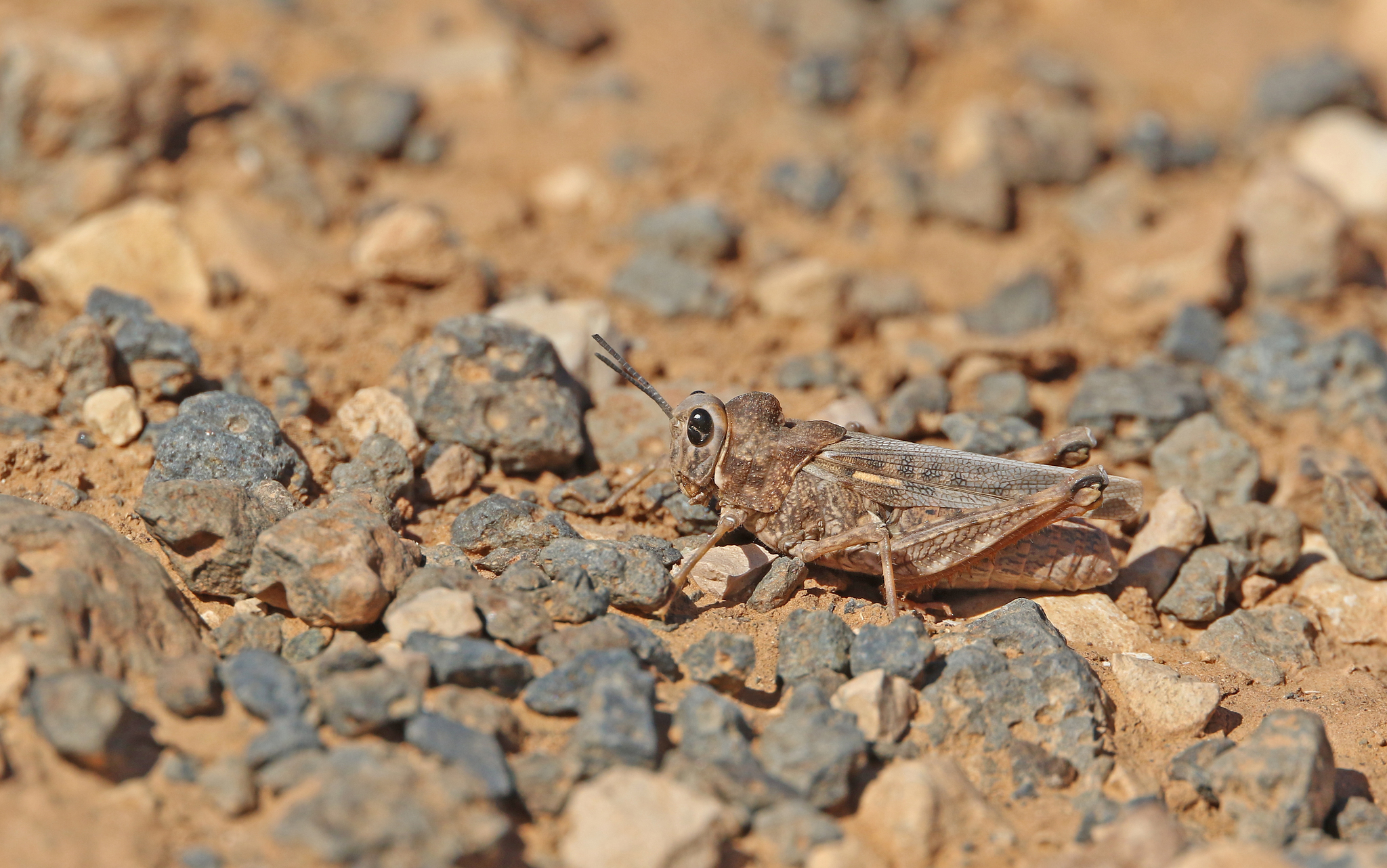
- Dericorys lobata

Scientific classification
- Kingdom: Animalia
- Phylum: Arthropoda
- Class: Insecta
- Order: Orthoptera
- Suborder: Caelifera
- Family: Dericorythidae
- Subfamily: Dericorythinae
- Genus: Dericorys; Serville, 1838

Synonyms
- Corystoderes Bolívar, 1936; Cyphophorus Fischer von Waldheim, 1846; Dericoris Stål, 1875; Dericorystes Brunner von Wattenwyl, 1893; Derocorys Jacobson, 1905; Derocorystes Burmeister, 1840

= Dericorys =

Genus of grasshoppers

Dericorys is the type genus of grasshoppers of the family Dericorythidae. Species have been recorded from Africa, the Iberian Peninsula, Atlantic islands and western-central Asia.

Two species, D. albidula and D. annulata defoliate Haloxylon in Central Asia and may be called "saxaul locusts" or "saxaul humpbacked grasshoppers"; on the other hand, D. minutus is critically endangered.

== Species ==
The Orthoptera Species File lists:

1. Dericorys albidula Serville, 1838 - type species
2. Dericorys annulata Fieber, 1853
3. Dericorys carthagonovae Bolívar, 1897 - Iberian peninsula
4. Dericorys cyrtosterna Uvarov, 1933
5. Dericorys escalerai Bolívar, 1936
6. Dericorys guichardi Dirsh, 1950
7. Dericorys johnstoni Uvarov, 1933
8. Dericorys lobata Brullé, 1840
9. Dericorys millierei Bonnet & Finot, 1884
10. Dericorys minutus Chopard, 1954
11. Dericorys murati Uvarov, 1938
12. Dericorys philbyi Uvarov, 1933
13. Dericorys ramachandrai Uvarov, 1933
14. Dericorys tibialis Pallas, 1773
15. Dericorys uvarovi Ramme, 1930
16. Dericorys vitrea Bey-Bienko, 1957
17. Dericorys xenosterna Uvarov, 1933
18. Dericorys yemenita Ingrisch, 1999
