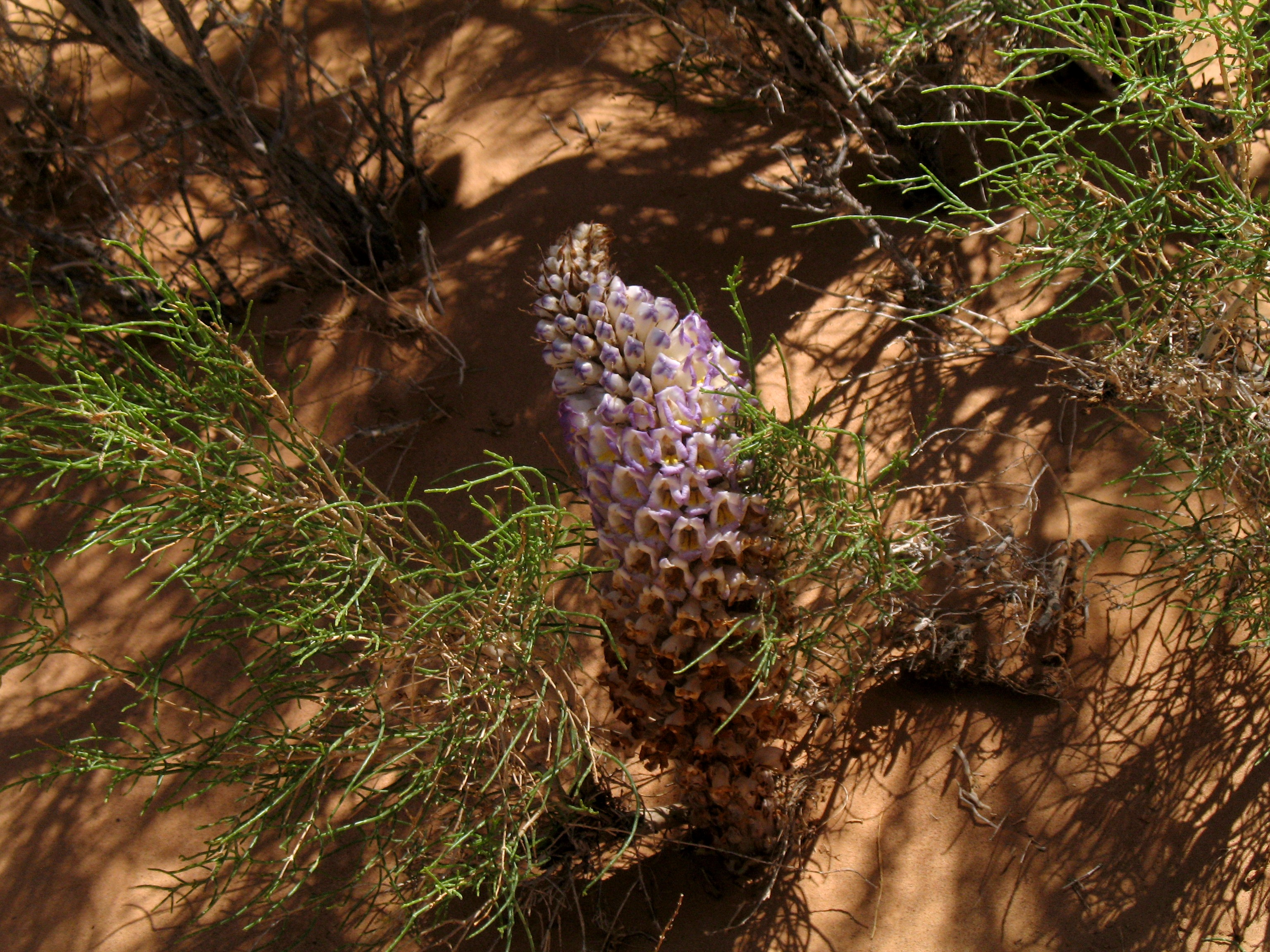

Conservation status
- CITES Appendix II

Scientific classification
- Kingdom: Plantae
- Clade: Embryophytes
- Clade: Tracheophytes
- Clade: Angiosperms
- Clade: Eudicots
- Clade: Asterids
- Order: Lamiales
- Family: Orobanchaceae
- Genus: Cistanche
- Species: C. deserticola

Binomial name
- Cistanche deserticola Ma

= Cistanche deserticola =

Species of flowering plant

Cistanche deserticola is a holoparasitic member of the plant family Orobanchaceae, commonly known as desert-broomrape.

The plant lacks chlorophyll and obtains its nutrients and water in a parasitic fashion from the black saxaul (Haloxylon ammodendron) and white saxaul (Haloxylon persicum).

== Description ==
Cistanche deserticola is a perennial hardy, shrub-like herb 40–160 centimetres (1 ft 4 in – 5 ft 3 in) tall. It is shaped somewhat like a cross between a pine cone and a pineapple, with thick, fleshy stems and large, yellow flowers that grow smaller at the plant's apex.

== Distribution ==
Cistanche deserticola is widely distributed in China's deserts including the provinces of Gansu, Shaanxi, and Qinghai, and the Autonomous Regions of Xinjiang, Ningxia, and Inner Mongolia.

== Traditional uses ==
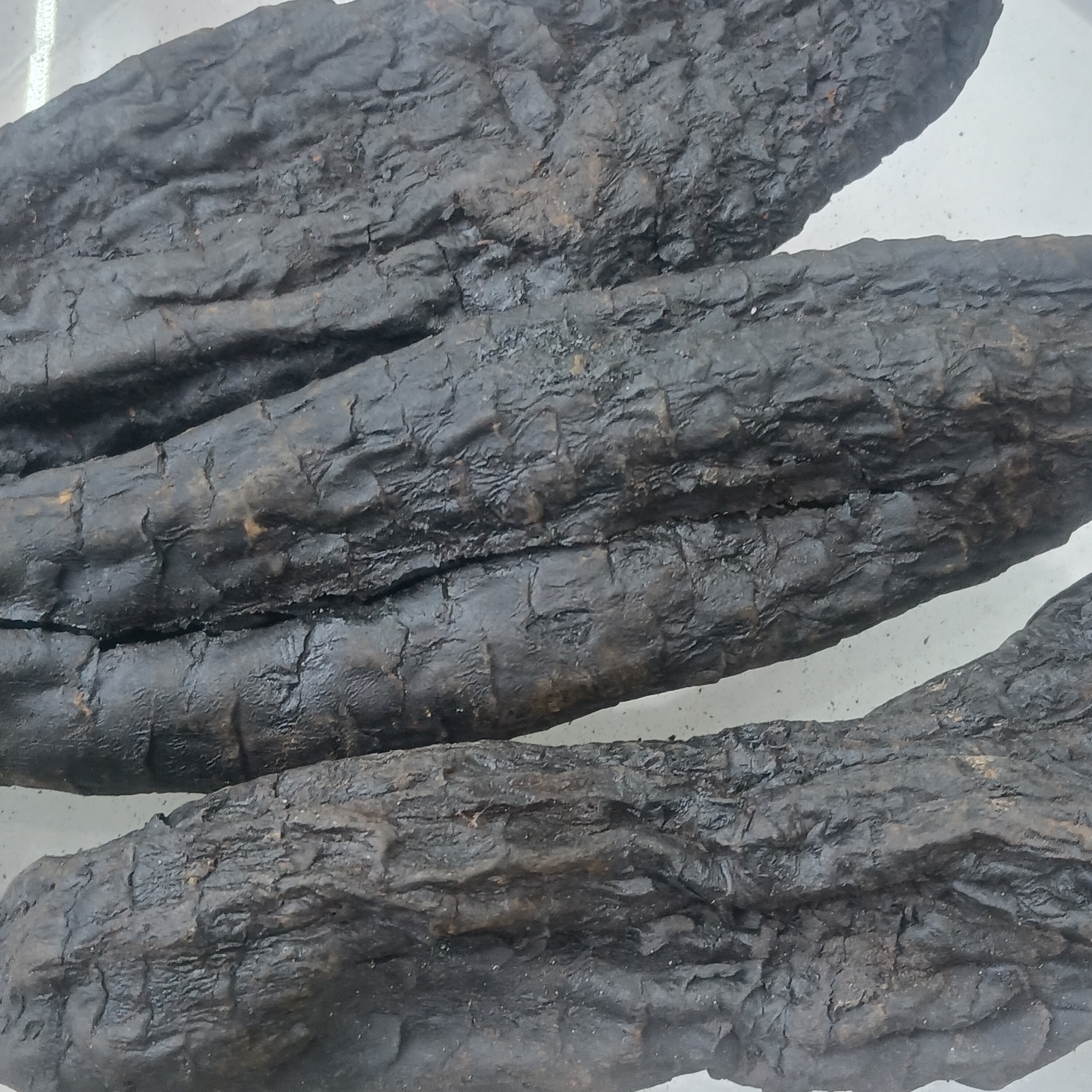
Cistanche deserticola for sale in the market

Along with other members of the genus Cistanche, Cistanche deserticola is a noted source of the Chinese herbal medicine cistanche (Chinese: 肉苁蓉; pinyin: ròucōngróng), commonly called Rou Cong Rong. Pharmaceutical materials, known in Chinese as suosuo dayuan (Chinese: 索索大元), are produced by slicing the stems of the plant. Inner Mongolia is the top native-producing area of the species; annual production is about 70 tons. The stems are gathered in the spring, when the sprouts have not come out of the ground or have just come up, dried in the sun and cut into slices for medicinal use. Cistanche deserticola has been placed on CITES Appendix 2, a list of endangered species not banned from trade but requiring monitoring. With increased consumption of cistanche, the population of the species has decreased and its area of distribution has shrunk. Aside from over-collection or indiscriminate collection, an important factor in the diminished supply of cistanche is a loss of the saxaul host, which is widely used for firewood.
