= Metallole =

Metalloles are metallacycle derivatives of cyclopentadiene in which the carbon atom at position 5, the saturated carbon, is replaced by a heteroatom. In contrast to its parent compound, the numbering of the metallole starts at the heteroatom. Some of these compounds are described as organometallic compounds, but in the list below quite a number of metalloids are present too. Some metalloles are fluorescent. Polymeric derivatives of pyrrole and thiophene are of interest in molecular electronics. Metalloles, which can also be viewed as structural analogs of pyrrole, include:

Calculated geometry and inversion barrier energy E for some C_{4}H_{4}MH metalloles
Name	M	d(M-C), Å	d(M-H), Å	α(C-M-C), °	E, kJ/mol
Pyrrole	N	1.37	1.01	110	0
Phosphole	P	1.81	1.425	90.5	67
Arsole	As	1.94	1.53	86	125
Stibole	Sb	2.14	1.725	80.5	160
Bismole	Bi	2.24	1.82	78	220

- Arsole, a moderately-aromatic arsenic analog
- Bismole, a bismuth analog
- Borole, a boron analog
- Furan (oxole), an oxygen analog
- Gallole, a gallium analog
- Germole, a germanium analog
- Phosphole, a phosphorus analog
- Pyrrole (azole), a nitrogen analog
- Selenophene, a selenium analog
- Silole, a silicon analog
- Stannole, a tin analog
- Stibole, an antimony analog
- Tellurophene, a tellurium analog
- Plumbole, a lead analog
- Thiophene, a sulfur analog
- Titanacyclopentadiene, e.g. (C_{5}H_{5})_{2}TiC_{4}Ph_{4}
- Zirconacyclopentadiene, e.g. (C_{5}H_{5})_{2}ZrC_{4}Ph_{4}
- Ferrole, an iron analog

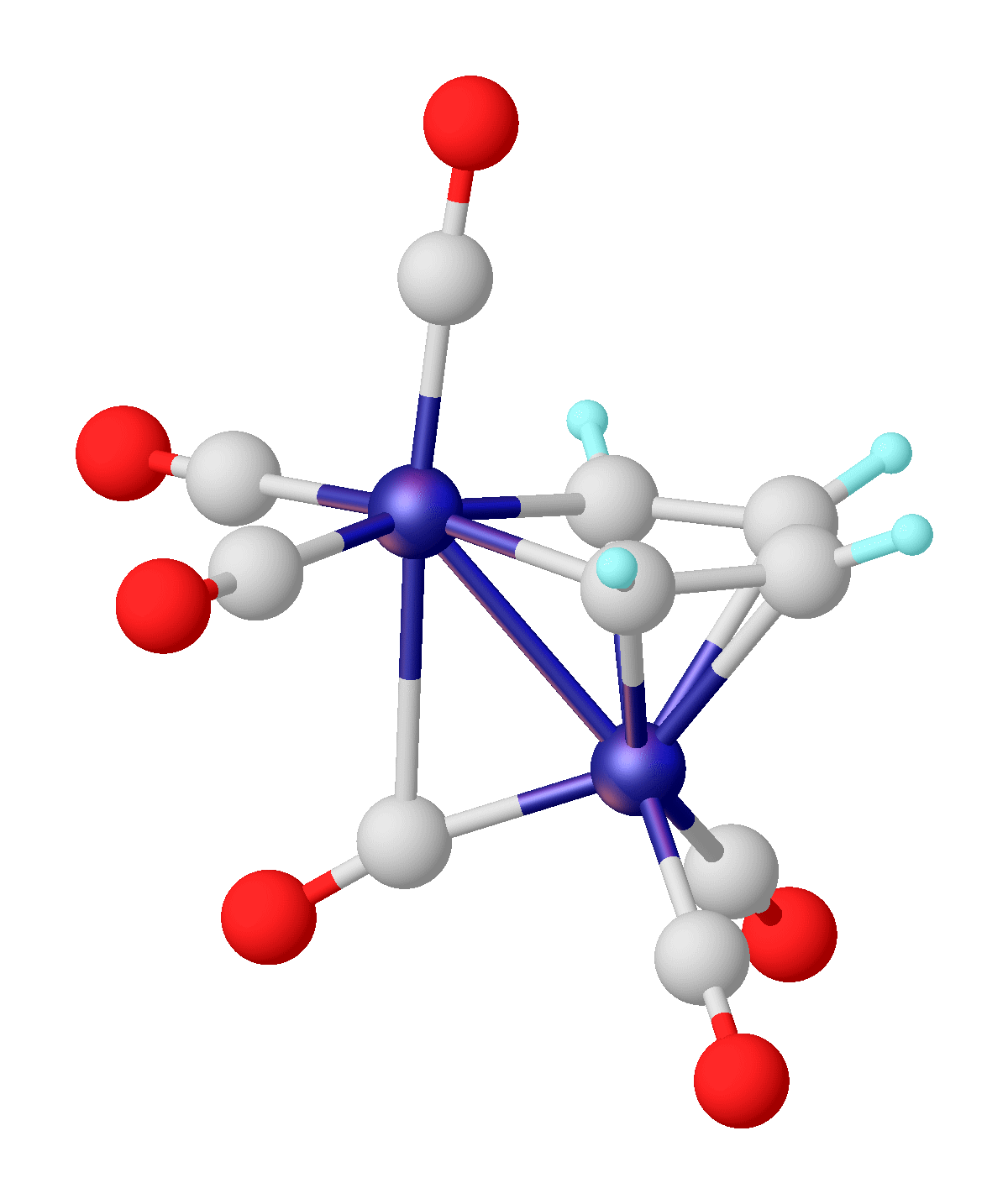
Structure of the ferrole complex Fe_{2}(C_{4}H_{4})(CO)_{6}.

== See also ==
- Metallacyclopentanes
