= Borole =

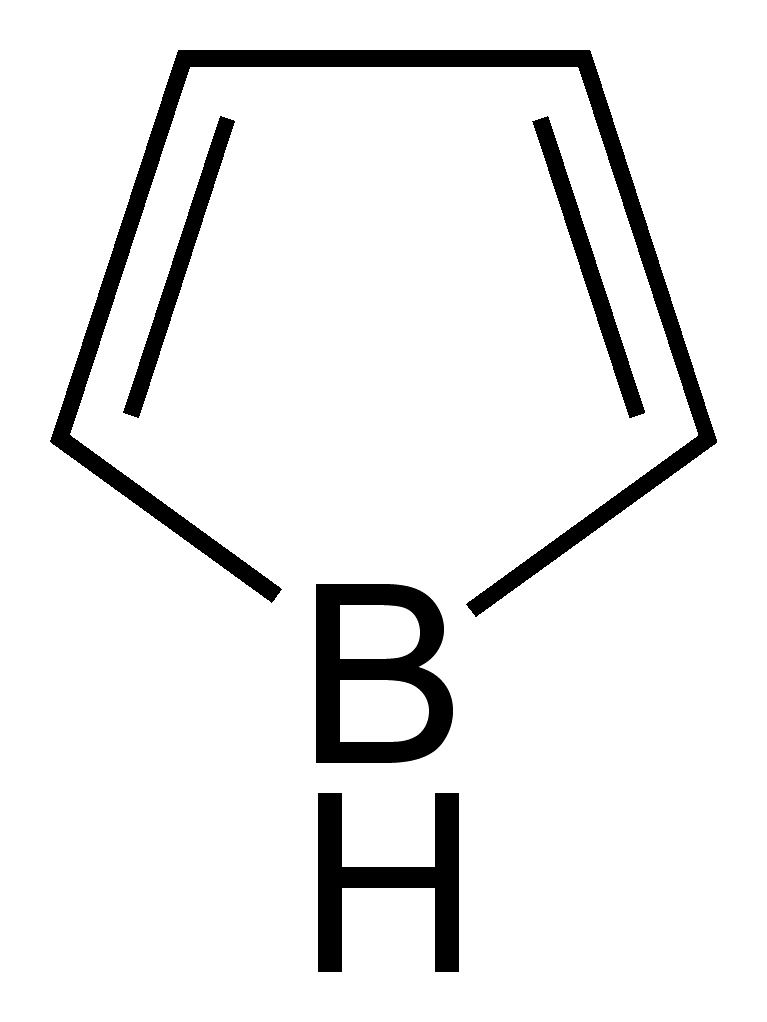

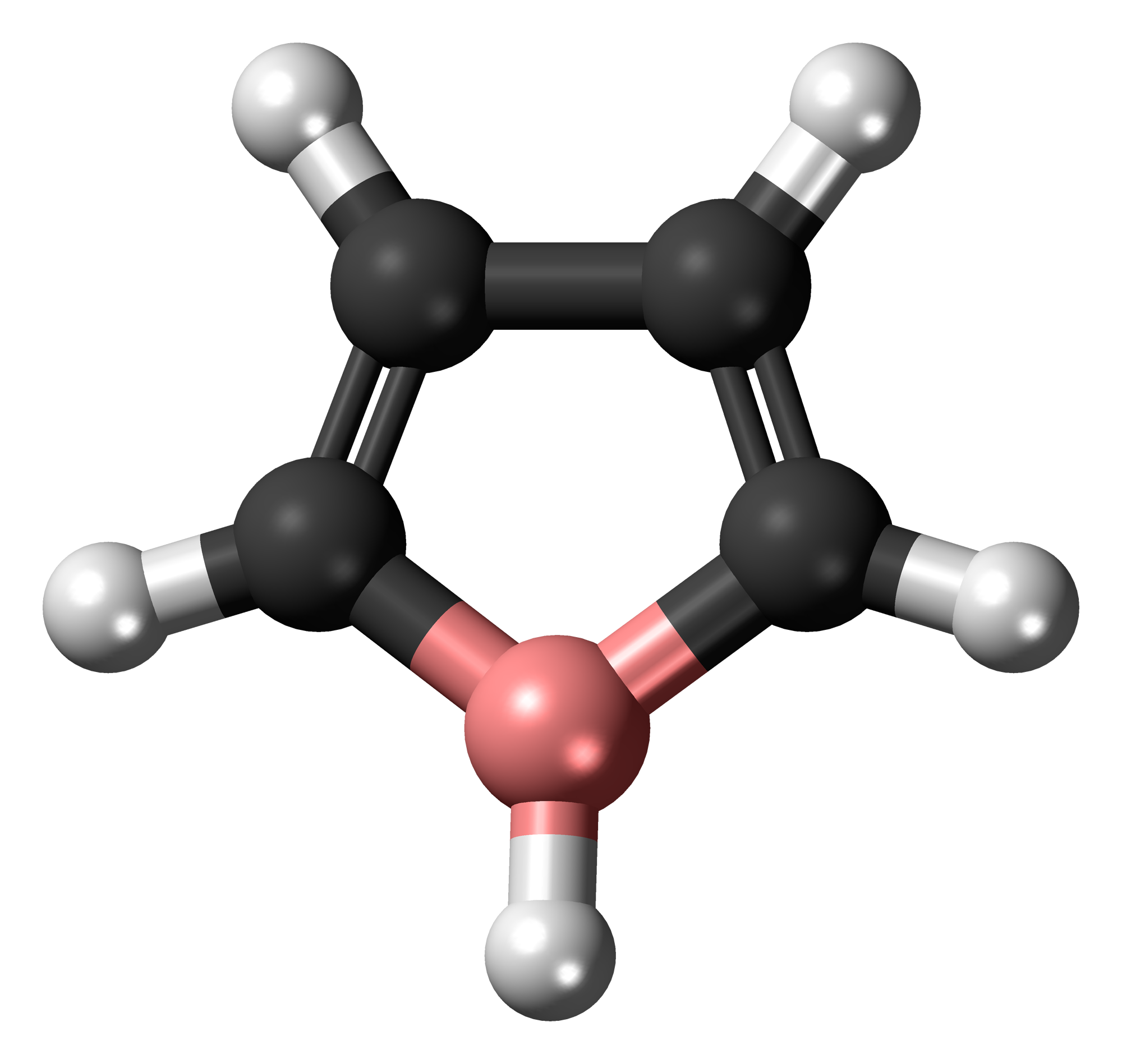

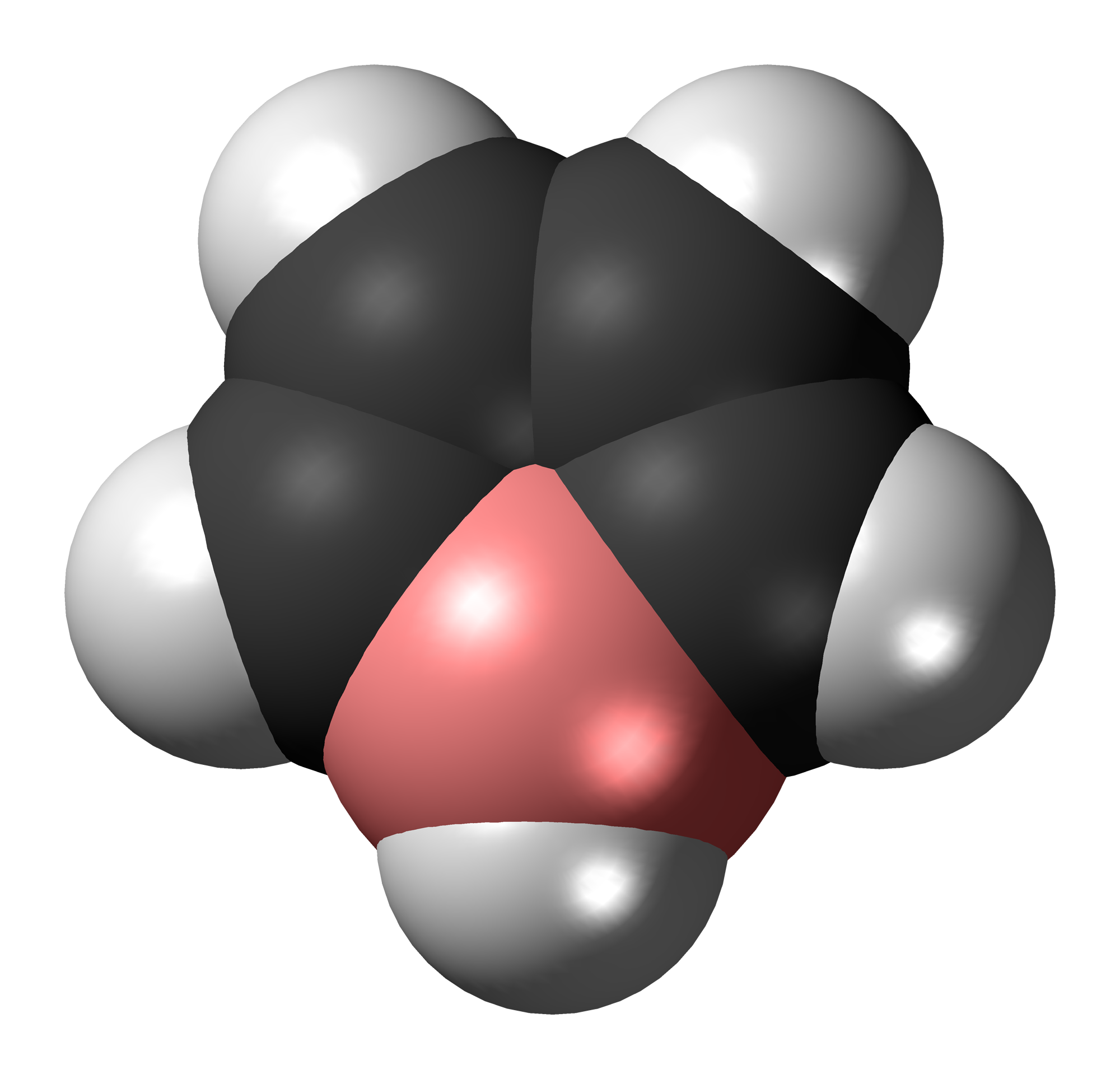

Names
- Preferred IUPAC name 1H-Borole

Identifiers
CAS Number	287-87-6
3D model (JSmol)	Interactive image
ChemSpider	10709008
PubChem CID	101923629
CompTox Dashboard (EPA)	DTXSID80610722
- InChI: InChI=1S/C4H5B/c1-2-4-5-3-1/h1-5H Key: XQIMLPCOVYNASM-UHFFFAOYSA-N; InChI=1/C4H5B/c1-2-4-5-3-1/h1-5H Key: XQIMLPCOVYNASM-UHFFFAOYAW
- SMILES: C1=CC=CB1

Properties
Chemical formula	C_{4}H_{5}B
Molar mass	63.89 g·mol^{−1}
- Except where otherwise noted, data are given for materials in their standard state (at 25 °C [77 °F], 100 kPa). verify (what is ?) Infobox references

Boroles represent a class of molecules known as metalloles, which are heterocyclic 5-membered rings. As such, they can be viewed as structural analogs of cyclopentadiene, pyrrole or furan, with boron replacing a carbon, nitrogen and oxygen atom respectively. They are isoelectronic with the cyclopentadienyl cation C_{5}H^{+}_{5} or abbreviated as Cp^{+} and comprise four π electrons. Although Hückel's rule cannot be strictly applied to borole, it is considered to be antiaromatic due to having 4 π electrons. As a result, boroles exhibit unique electronic properties not found in other metalloles.

The parent unsubstituted compound with the chemical formula C_{4}H_{4}BH has yet to be isolated outside a coordination sphere of transition metals. Substituted derivatives, which have been synthesized, can have various substituents at the 4 carbons and boron. The high electron deficiency leads to various reactivities such as metal free hydrogen activation and rearrangements upon cycloaddition which are unobserved in other structural analogues like pyrrole or furan.

Once reduced to the dianion, the borolediide complex gains aromaticity and can then participate in similar reactions as the Cp^{−} anion, including forming sandwich complexes.

== Electronic properties ==
=== Hückel analysis ===
According to Hückel's rule which states that a cyclic molecule is aromatic if it has (4n + 2) π electrons and antiaromatic if there are 4n electrons, boroles represent antiaromatic molecules. In agreement with chemical intuition, ab initio calculations on the parent borole C_{4}H_{4}BH predict it to have an antiaromatic singlet ground state. Its backbone structure features strongly alternating bond lengths, consistent with localised electrons in the π system. This characteristic is preserved in almost all structurally characterised borole derivatives except those derived from [PhBC_{4}Ph_{4}]. This discrepancy was attributed to intermolecular phenyl→boron π donation within dimeric subunits.

In addition, theoretical studies also suggest that borole is significantly destabilised by the delocalisation of its four π electrons (NICS 17.2; ASE 19.3 kcal mol^{−1}). UV-Vis spectroscopy and reactivity studies have been conducted to assess the consequences of antiaromaticity in boroles. Their antiaromatic character entails strong electrophilicity of the boron center resulting in even weak donors such as ethers or nitriles being capable of forming stable Lewis acid–base adducts. Moreover, boroles' highly activated carbon backbone readily participates in Diels–Alder reactions and is prone to two-electron reductions affording borolediides.

A simple Hückel model can be used to compare the spectroscopic properties and observed reactivity of boroles against the isoelectronic cyclopentadienyl cation [C_{5}H_{5}]^{+}. Unlike [C_{5}H_{5}]^{+} which has a doubly degenerate pair of HOMOs, the introduction of a boron center lifts their degeneracy by increasing the energy of the antisymmetric molecular orbital somewhat and the symmetric molecular orbital significantly. As a result, the HOMO in boroles is doubly occupied and no biradical character is observed, in line with a singlet ground state and the diamagnetic character of boroles. Furthermore, boroles exhibit a small HOMO–LUMO gap (principally consisting of a π–π* transition) and the lowest-energy electronic absorption of boroles is considerably red shifted in the UV-Vis spectra (e.g. [PhBC_{4}Ph_{4}]: λ_{max} = 560 nm). Accordingly, boroles exhibit a characteristic blue color.

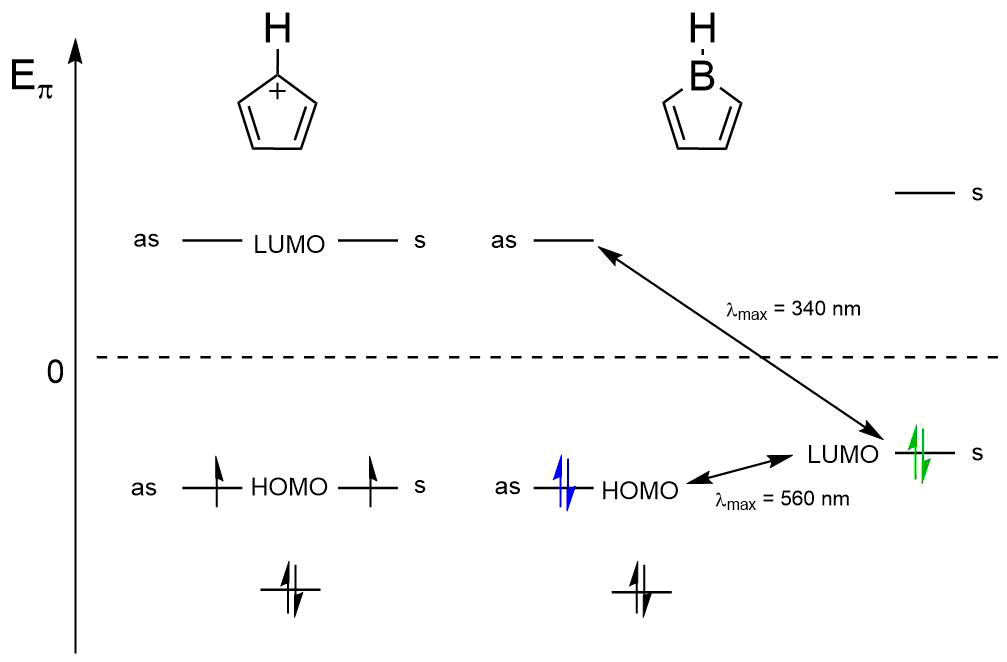
Qualitative comparison of molecular orbitals. Left: Cyclopentadienyl cation. Right: Borole. The green electrons represent the electronic state after coordinating to a Lewis base

By contrast, introducing two electrons into the vacant LUMO either by reduction or adduct formation with Lewis bases significantly increases the HOMO–LUMO gap. Consequently, a dramatic blue shift of the lowest-energy excitation is observed (e.g. [PhBC_{4}Ph_{4}]·pyridine: λ_{max} = 340 nm) and the resulting species are usually yellow to red in color. A qualitative drawing is presented to the left. The small HOMO-LUMO gap also makes boroles excellent participants in Diels–Alder type reactions either with themselves or with a variety of alkenes and alkynes.

=== Natural bond orbitals ===
Natural bond orbital (NBO) analysis of C_{4}H_{4}BH has been performed in order to understand the bonding of borole in the familiar Lewis picture. According to the computational results, the occupancy of the two C−C π orbitals is about 1.9, with a tiny amount of electronic charge (an occupancy of 0.13) delocalised on the out-of-plane boron p orbital, illustrated below. The standard Lewis structure of borole captures more than 50% of the overall electronic structure according to Natural Resoanance Theory analysis. As delocalisation of the 4π electrons is prevented by antiaromaticity, the unsaturated boron atom has low occupancy of its vacant p_{z} orbital and is highly Lewis acidic. Along with the low energy LUMO, boroles show an inherent propensity to form Lewis acid–base adducts even with substrates of low donor strengths.

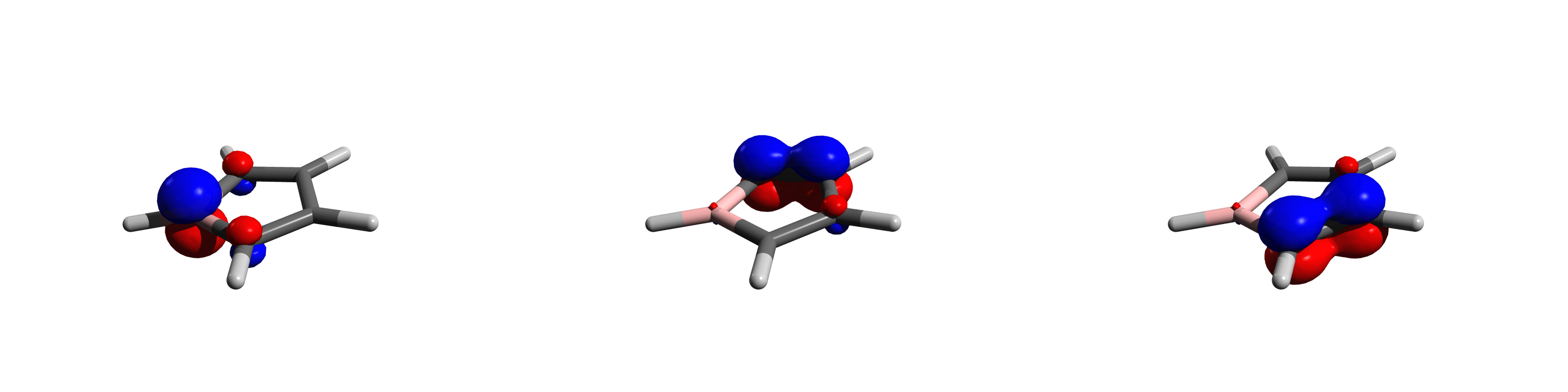
Natural Bonding Orbitals of Borole. Structure optimised using ORCA BP86-D3BJ and def2- TZVPP basis set. The calculated occupencies of the obitals going from left to right are 0.13, 1.9 and 1.9 respectively.

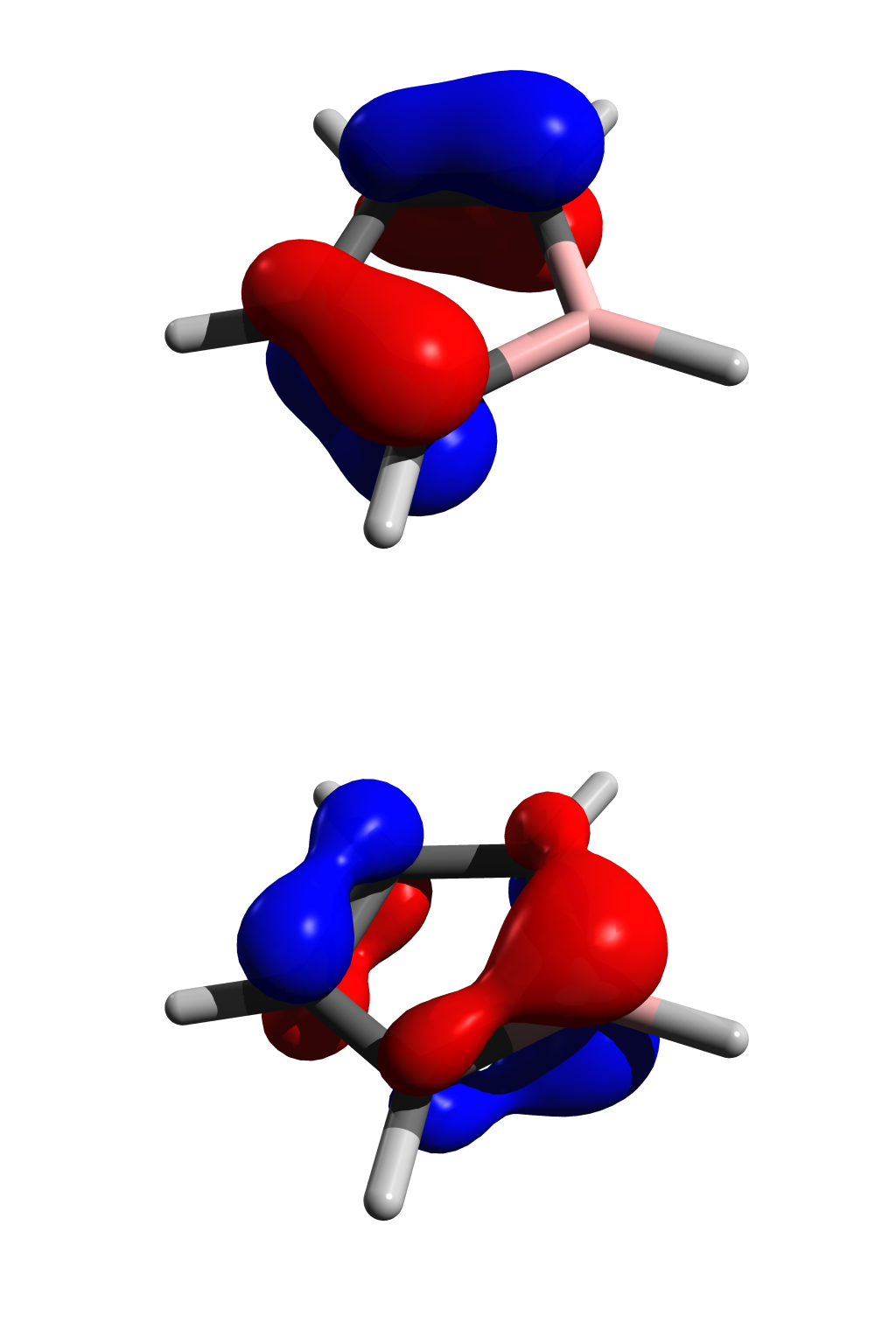
Frontier molecular orbitals of Borole optimised using ORCA BP86-D3BJ and def2- TZVPP basis set. Top: HOMO Bottom: LUMO

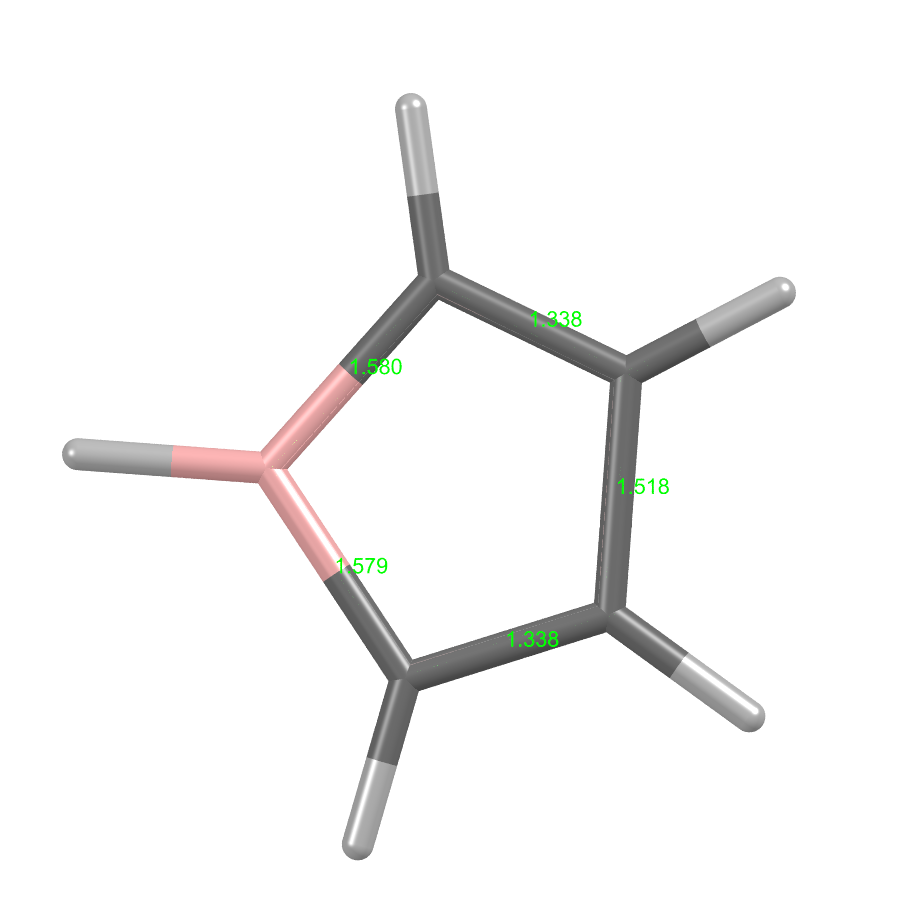
Bond lengths in Borole optimised at the CCSD(T)/6-311G(2df,p) level. Bond lengths are in Å.

As the p orbital of boron is virtually vacant and nonbonding (as indicated by its NBO energy level), borole is regarded as a good Lewis acid or electron acceptor. The figure to the right shows the lack of involvement of boron's p orbital in the HOMO and the substantial Lewis acidic character at boron in the LUMO. Chemically, borole is reactive and unstable in ambient conditions. The pentaphenylborole analog is a highly reactive green solid; it readily undergoes oxidation, partial protolysis, and Diels−Alder reaction with dienophiles. Borole, even in perarylated form, is still very labile. Due to its reactive nature, the structural parameters and thermochemical data of borole are not known.

In the optimized structure of borole shown to the left, the B^{1}C, ^{1}C^{2}C, and ^{2}C^{2}C bond lengths are approximately 1.58, 1.338, and 1.518 Å respectively, as shown to the left. The longer ^{2}C^{2}C bond in C_{4}H_{4}BH agree with NBO analysis that the π-electron delocalizations are mainly confined on the methine carbons, supporting the antiaromatic nature of the neutral borole.

=== Borole dianion (borolediides) ===
As the boron has an empty p orbital, boroles tend to accept 2 electrons in order to have 6 π electrons and gain aromaticity. This reduction to borolediides was demonstrated in the early 1980s by Herberich et al. with the isolation of K_{2}[PhBC_{4}Ph_{4}]. Because the atomic orbitals of boron are different from those from carbon in terms of energy, not all atoms contribute equally to the π system in the borole dianion. A Natural Resonance Theory (NRT) calculation shows that there are 3 dominant resonance structures for the isolated [C_{4}BH_{5}]^{2−} dianion as illustrated below.

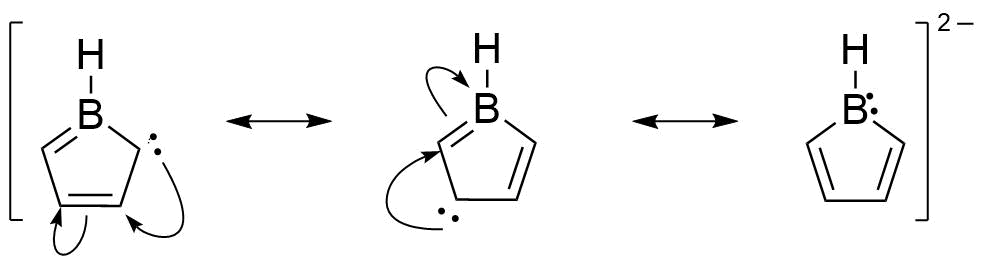
Resonance forms in the Borole dianion. Contributions to overall structure are 30.30%, 30.71% and 13.04% respectively going from left to right as determed using NRT. Analyses were performed using NBO7 on a [C_{4}BH_{5}] ^{2-} structure optimised using BP86-D3BJ and def2- TZVPP basis set.

Since borole dianions are isoelectronic to the ubiquitous cyclopentadienyl anion, aromatic delocalisation of the 6π electrons should cause bond lengths assimilation within the BC_{4} backbone. This is exactly what was found for several characterised structures, namely K_{2}[PhBC_{4}Ph_{4}], K_{2}[(4-Me_{3}Si-C_{6}H_{4})BC_{4}Ph_{4}] and K_{2}[ClBC_{4}Ph_{4}]. Thus, the observed B–C bonds are rather short (1.505–1.543 Å) and all C–C bond lengths lie within a narrow array (1.409–1.456 Å).

== Synthesis ==
The first borole derivative to be isolated was pentaphenylborole [PhBC_{4}Ph_{4}], synthesised by Eisch et al. in 1969 as a deep blue solid. Referring to the figure below, the practical synthesis of [PhBC_{4}Ph_{4}] (1) was initially accomplished in two different ways: (a) by direct reaction of 1,4-dilithio-1,2,3,4-tetraphenylbutadiene with PhBBr_{2} which gives a Lewis base adduct of pentaphenylborole (1·OEt_{2}) in diethylether, and subsequent removal of the solvent. (b) By boron–tin exchange between 2,3,4,5-tetraphenylstannole derivatives with PhBCl_{2}. Eisch et al. have demonstrated that the latter method can be expanded to other borole derivatives, even though these species have only been generated in situ.

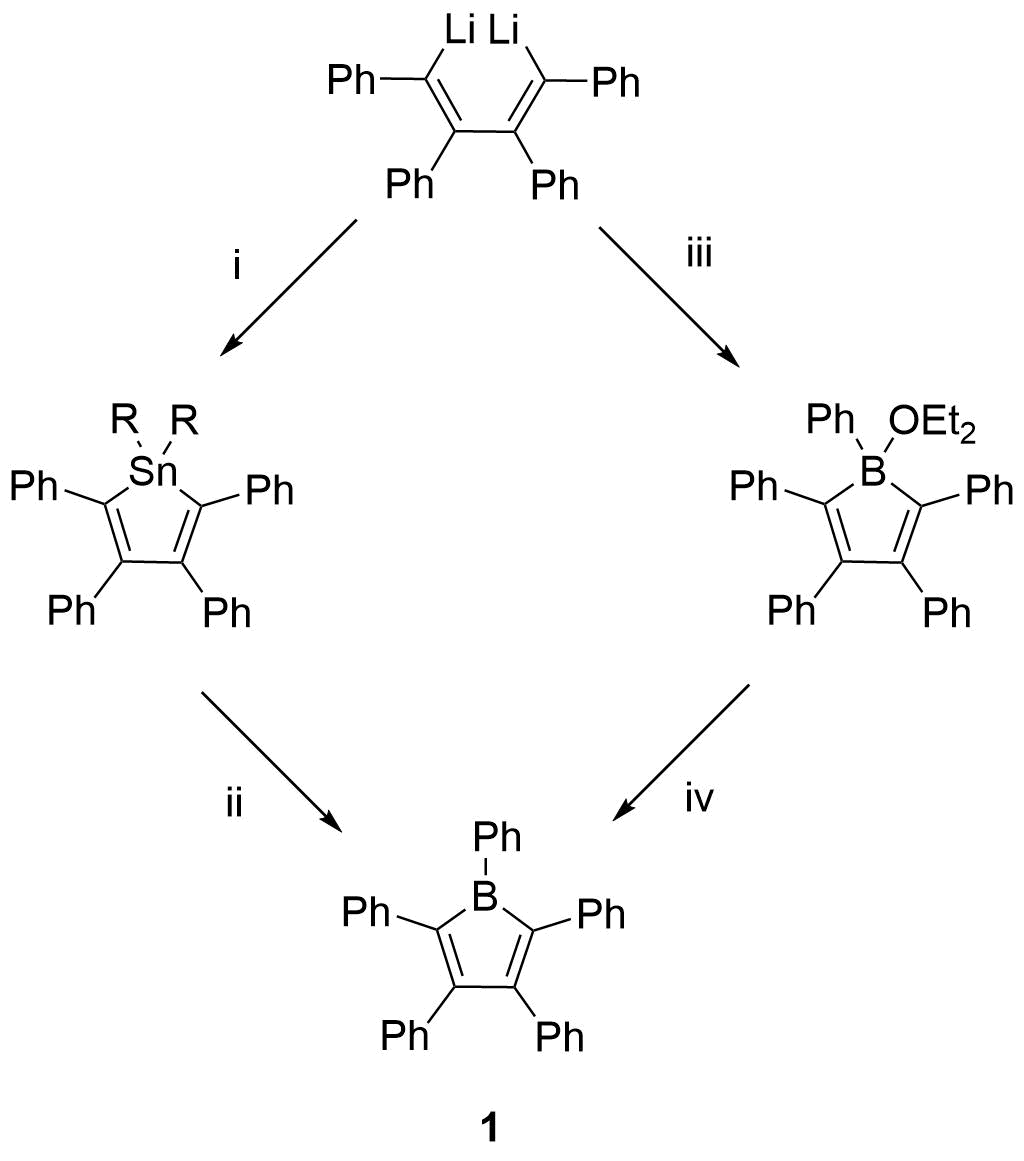
Synthesis of substituted boroles. Reaction conditions: (i) R_{2}'SnCl_{2},THF/Et_{2}O; (ii) PhBCl_{2}, PhMe; (iii) PhBBr_{2}, Et_{2}O; (iv) -Et_{2}O

Accounting for the drawbacks of each method, the boron–tin exchange is the current method of choice and has been widely accepted for the synthesis of numerous differently substituted borole derivatives. The other approach has yet to play a significant role in the further development of borole chemistry.
Besides the development of a synthetic pathway to the perfluorinated version of (1), the substituents on the BC_{4} backbone is largely still limited to phenyl substituents. However, substituents beside H has been attached to the boron atom, such as halide, aryl and amino functionalities. Ferrocenyl, cymantrenyl and platinum complex fragments have also been successfully attached.

Depending on the boron-bound substituent, the electron density at boron can be altered. Hence, substituents can exert strong influences on the spectroscopic properties of the whole borole system. For instance, significant π-back bonding interactions from nitrogen in [(Me_{3}Si)_{2}NBC_{4}Ph_{4}] raises the borole LUMO energy and a resulting blue shift of the lowest energy absorption in UV-Vis spectra (λ_{max} = 478 nm) compared to [PhBC_{4}Ph_{4}] (λ_{max} = 560 nm).

In order to synthesis less sterically congested boroles, a zirconacycle transfer strategy was adopted by Fagan et al. Reaction of [Cp_{2}ZrC_{4}Me_{4}] with PhBCl_{2} was expected to result in the formation of [PhBC_{4}Me_{4}]. However, the product was too reactive and only its Diels–Alder dimer has been isolated. Evidence for the intermediate [PhBC_{4}Me_{4}] before dimerisation was shown through trapping experiments with 2-butyne and reactivity studies using a variety of unactivated alkenes.

In 2018, Lee et al. successfully transformed a borapyramidane into a stable halogen substituted planar borole dianion which was stabilized by Li^{+} ions positioned above and below the plane of the borole ring, revealing a direct synthetic path to borolediides from borapyramidane.

== Reactions ==
Pentaphenylborole is known to show a wide range of reactivity, owing to its antiaromatic and highly Lewis acidic nature.

=== Lewis acid-base adducts ===
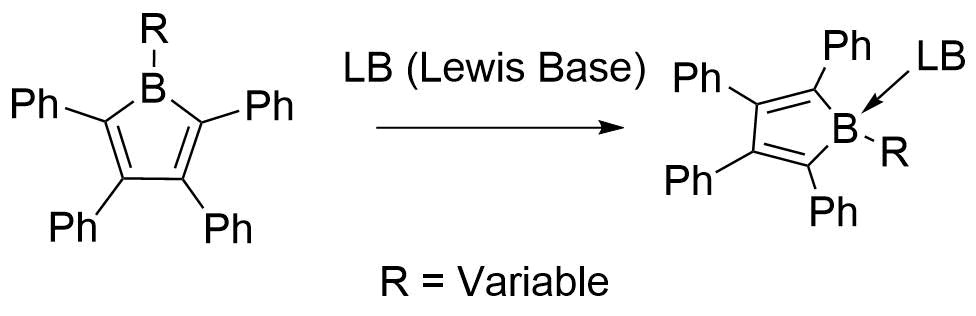

As suggested previously, the high Lewis acidity of boroles allows the ready formation of Lewis acid–base adducts with a variety of different donor molecules. This simplest case of reactivity has already been realised in the early days and has frequently been used to highlight the antiaromatic nature of boroles. Pyridines, ethers, phosphines, and different carbene species have been successfully attached to the unsaturated boron center.

In general, such reactions are facile and proceed quantitatively, facilitating their isolation in high yield. Upon Lewis base coordination, the former vacant p orbital at boron becomes occupied and cyclic delocalization of the π electron system is no longer feasible, corresponding to the loss of antiaromaticity. However, strong bond length alternation in the BC_{4} backbone is still observed and remain almost unaffected by these fundamental electronic changes. In contrast, spectroscopic measurements are much more sensitive to adduct formation. Unlike the respective borole precursors which are intensely coloured, the adducts are pale yellow solids with characteristic UV-Vis excitations at λ_{max} = 350–380 nm which agrees with an increase in the HOMO-LUMO gap.

=== Addition reactions with unsaturated carbon compounds ===
As a result of only having 4 electrons in the planar π system, boroles experience a large destabilizing effect and thus exhibits high reactivity, such as in dimerisations and cycloadditions. This is why stable borole derivatives can only be achieved by employing bulky substituents around the reactive BC_{4} core.

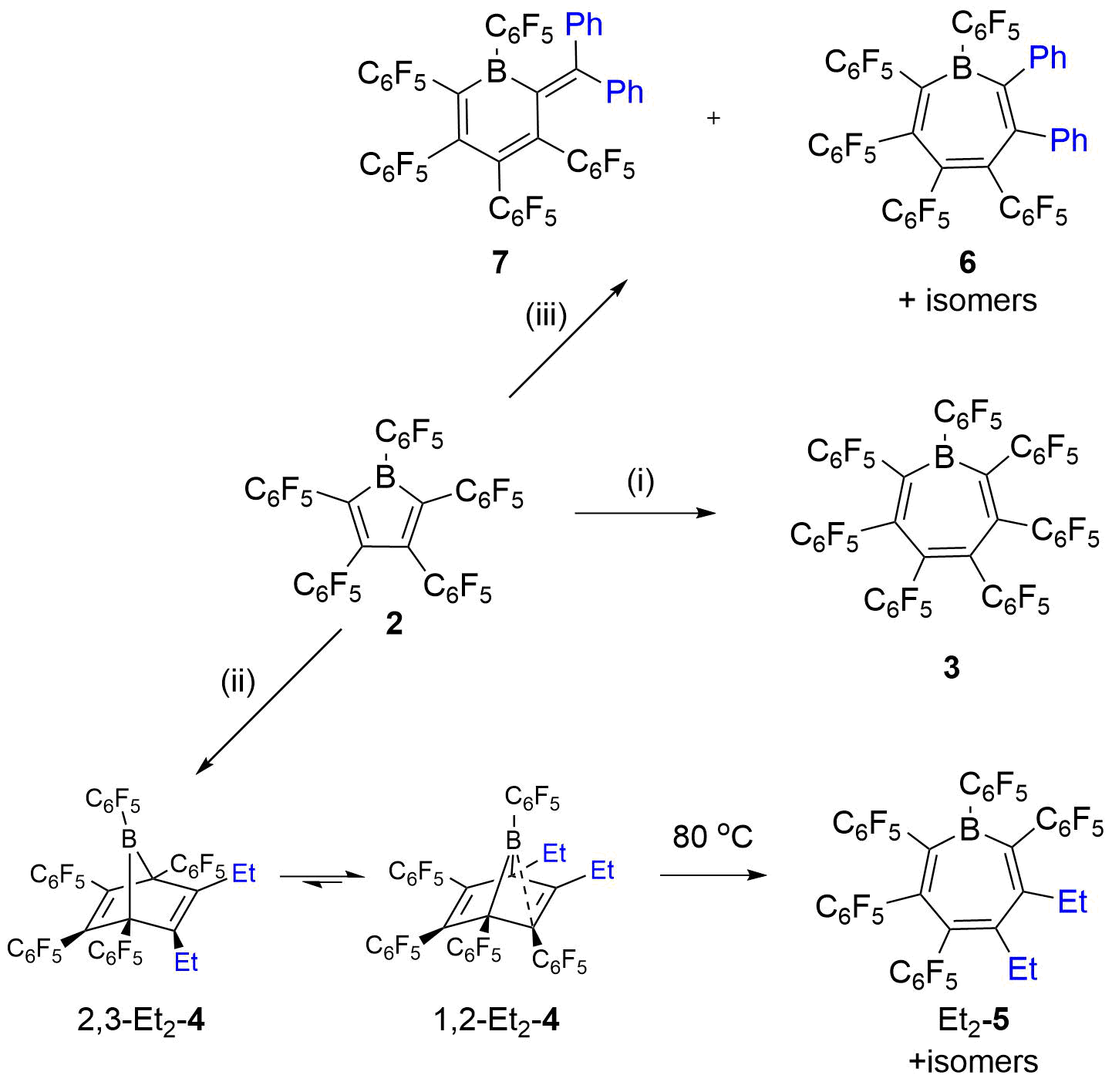
Reaction conditions: (i) (C_{6}F_{5})CC(C_{6}F_{5}), toluene, 110 °C, 7 d; (ii) EtCCEt, CH_{2}Cl_{2}, RT; (iii) PhCCPh, CH_{2}Cl_{2}, RT.

The small HOMO-LUMO gap of boroles makes them eminently suitable as Diels–Alder participants. The reaction of [PhBC_{4}Ph_{4}] (1) with diphenylacetylene to afford aromatic heptaphenylborepine has been reported by Eisch et al. in the “paradigm of pericyclic reactions”. Recently, the interest in this reaction pathway was revived by Piers et al.., who studied the reactivity of perfluorinated [PhBC_{4}Ph_{4}] (2 in the figure above) towards alkynes in great detail. Of particular relevance was the question of whether the enhanced Lewis acidity of 2 compared 1 affects its reactivity and whether that entails novel reactivity patterns. In that study, 2 was reacted with three differently substituted alkynes that greatly differed in their electronic properties, namely (C_{6}F_{5})CC(C_{6}F_{5}), (C_{6}H_{5})CC(C_{6}H_{5}) and Et–CC–Et.

The reaction with the electron-poor alkyne (C_{6}F_{5})CC(C_{6}F_{5}) required rather harsh reaction conditions (110 °C, 7 days) and the only observable species was the expected Diels–Alder product (3), whose formation presumably follows a mechanism similar to that proposed for 5. The same pathway was found for the more electron-rich Et–CC–Et (3-hexyne). However, the mild reaction conditions (spontaneous at room temperature) enabled the isolation of the direct Diels–Alder cycloaddition product 1,2-Et_{2}-4, which is considered the thermodynamically favored isomer of the two possible 7-borabicyclo[2.2.1]hepta-dienes. Prolonged heating of solutions of 4 resulted in the formation of various products, some of which have been identified as borepine isomers of Et_{2}-5 based on ^{11}B NMR data. This provides for the first time conclusive experimental evidence for the proposed mechanism of borepine formation from boroles and alkynes.

However, the reaction of 2 with diphenylacetylene gave unexpected results. Similar to the observations described for 3-hexyne, the electron rich PhCCPh facilitated a spontaneous reaction. Surprisingly, the diphenyl-substituted heptaarylborepine isomers 6 formed by the common Diels–Alder reactivity represented only minor components of the product mixture (25%). The potent Lewis acidity of 12 revealed a novel reaction pathway whereby the alkyne first adds to the borole nucleophilically, followed by subsequent aryl migration and ring expansion to afford the boracyclohexadiene 7 as the predominant species (75%).

Both reaction pathways likely compete with each other and as a result, the nature of the alkyne (nucleophilicity, substitution pattern) strongly dictates which reactivity is favored.

==== Ring expansion ====
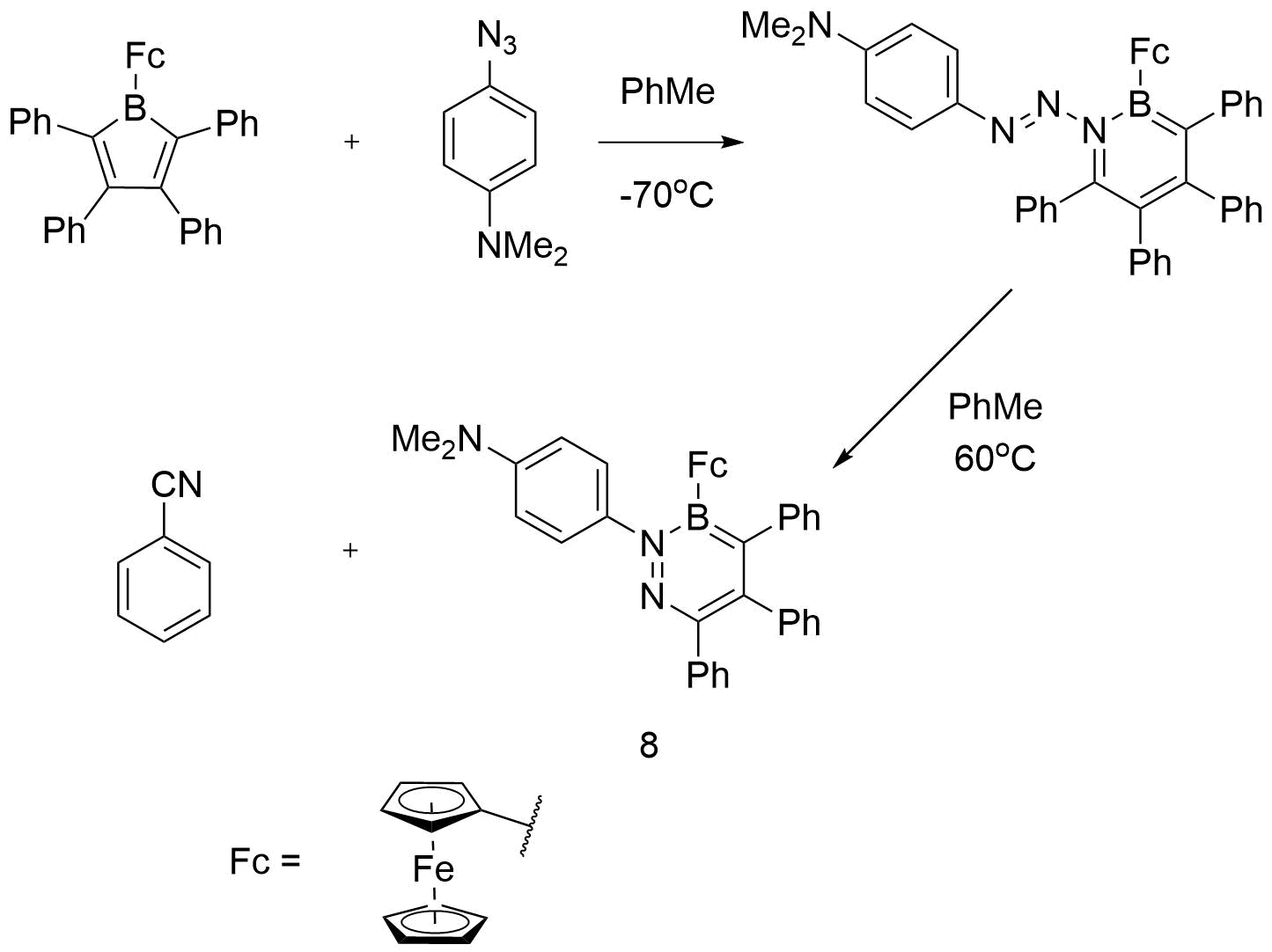

The highly reactive nature of boroles also leads to them participating in ring expansion reactions upon reaction with azides. In the reaction of 1-(2,3,4,5-tetraphenylborolyl)ferrocene with 4-azido-N,N-dimethylaniline to generate a new species (8 in the figure above). Cyclic voltammetry studies indicated that the 1,2,3-diazaborinine exhibits similar electronic effects to that of pyridine, which makes (8) weakly electron-withdrawing. Analyses of the frontier molecular orbitals using DFT shows that the HOMO mainly comprises the iron d_{x2-y2} orbital while the LUMO resides largely on the BN pyridine ring as an antibonding π* orbital. As (8) contains two nucleophilic nitrogen lone pairs, NBO calculations were performed to assess the charges at nitrogen and determine which might be the more reactive. Results show that the partial charges of the pyridine and dimethylamino nitrogen atoms are -0.232 and -0.446 respectively, suggesting a larger accumulation of electron density on the latter group which should make it the more reactive nucleophile.

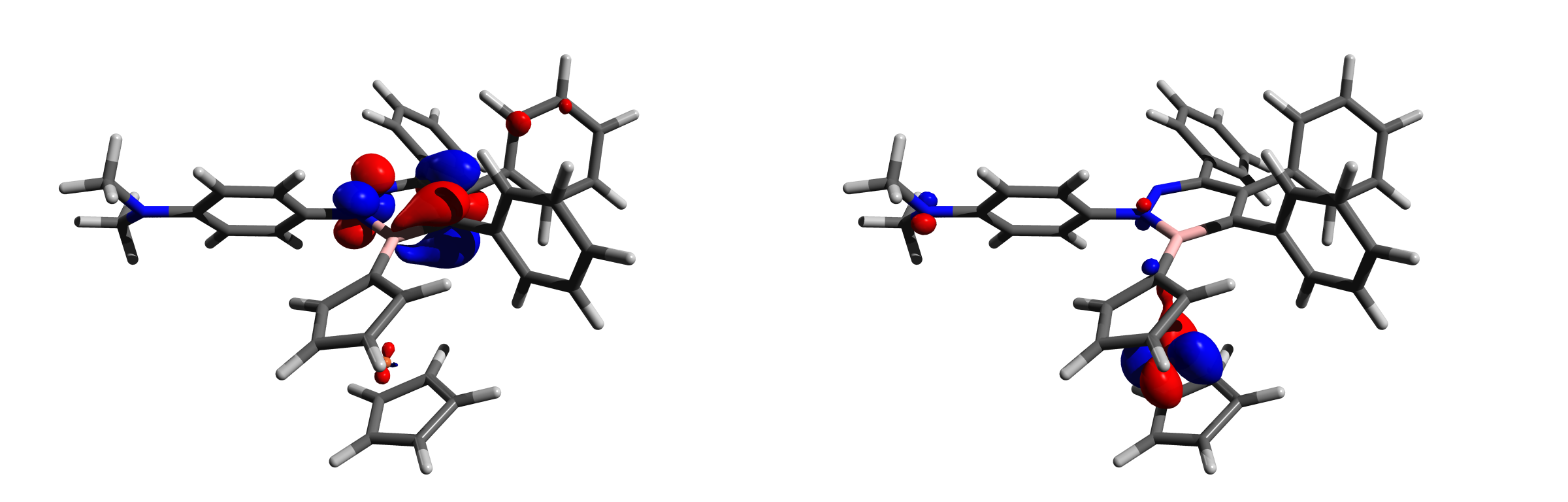
HOMO and LUMO of 8. Left: LUMO Right: HOMO. Structures optimised at the B3LYP level and 6- 31G(d) basis set.

=== Metal-free H_{2}-activation ===
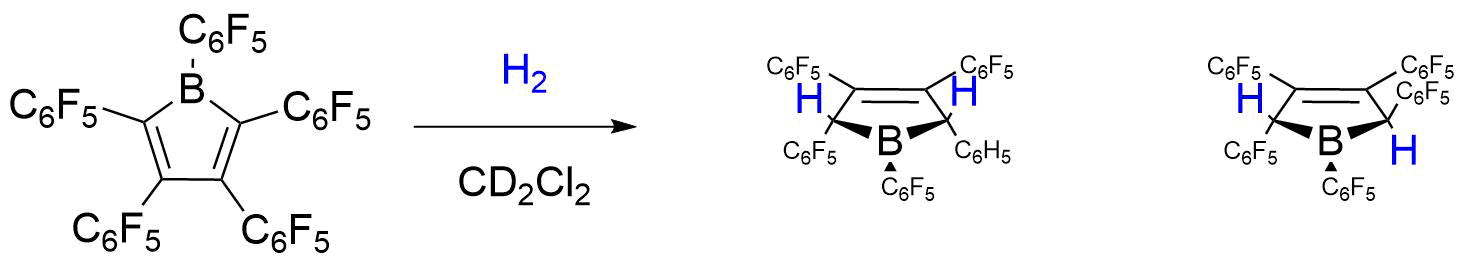

Given the many studies on frustrated Lewis pairs (FLP) that point them towards high potential small molecule activators, Piers and coworkers set out to investigate whether the strong electrophilicity of antiaromatic boroles might entail a comparable reactivity.

In a seminal paper published in 2010, they successfully demonstrated the metal-free activation of dihydrogen by [PhBC_{4}Ph_{4}] and its perfluorinated analog. Their studies initially focused on perfluorinated [PhBC_{4}Ph_{4}] due to its exceptionally high Lewis acid strength, which readily reacted with H_{2} both in solution and in the solid state to form two possible isomers as shown above. DFT calculations show that the trans product is thermodynamically favoured by 6.2 kcal mol^{−1}, but no interconversion between isomers was observed under thermal conditions. A plausible reaction mechanism involving a borole H_{2} adduct was proposed on the basis of the observed isomers ratios and theoretical studies. The authors suggested that the driving force is most likely provided by the disruption of antiaromaticity in the borole ring through ring opening. Even the less Lewis acidic borole 1 was shown to be capable of facile H–H bond cleavage to give similar reaction products (trans/cis: 1 : 4.3). Most likely, the unique combination of antiaromaticity and high Lewis acidity enables the metal-free activation of H_{2} by boroles.

=== Sandwich complexes ===
Since the borole dianion is isoelectronic to the cyclopentadienide anion, it also exhibits capability to from ferrocene-like sandwich compounds through an η^{5} coordination.

Boroles have been experimentally shown to form stable complexes other group 13 elements, such as aluminium and galium. Both were synthesised from the neutral substituted borole and the corresponding metal (I)-Cp* complex in benzene as summarised in below.

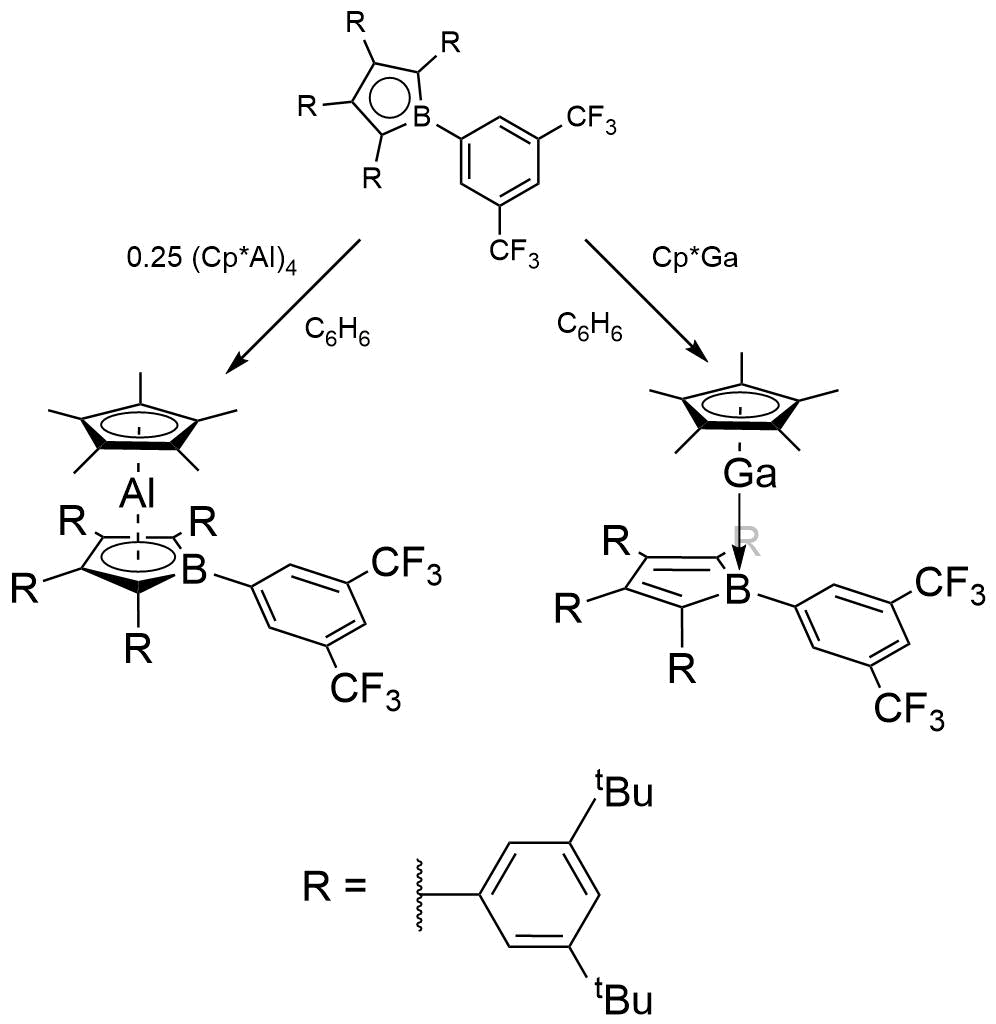
Synthesis of the Al and Ga sandwich complexes.

In the Aluminium complex, an Al (III) ion is sandwiched between a Cp*^{−} and a substituted borolediide dianion, giving an overall neutral structure. Sindlinger reported that examining the orbitals of the simpler hypothetical model complex (C_{4}BH_{5})Al(C_{5}H_{5}) revealed similar features to the fully substituted compound. The successful transfer of two electrons onto the borole ring becomes apparent from the borole-based HOMO essentially being identical with the LUMO in free borole. The oxidation of Al is further in line with Bader charges of +2.29 at Al and -0.78 on the borole (C_{4}B) unit. However, this charge resides on the butadiene backbone as opposed to on boron (C_{β} −0.24; C_{α} −0.99; B +1.68). In contrast, the charge accumulated on the central (C_{5})-Cp* moiety amounting to −1.17 is equally distributed among the five carbon atoms. Topology analysis was performed using QTAIM, which revealed no bond critical point between Al and B. In line with a strong localisation of electron density on C_{α}, bond critical points are only found for the between Al and C_{α} (delocalization index, DI=0.25) but not between Al and C_{β} (DI=0.11) as shown below.

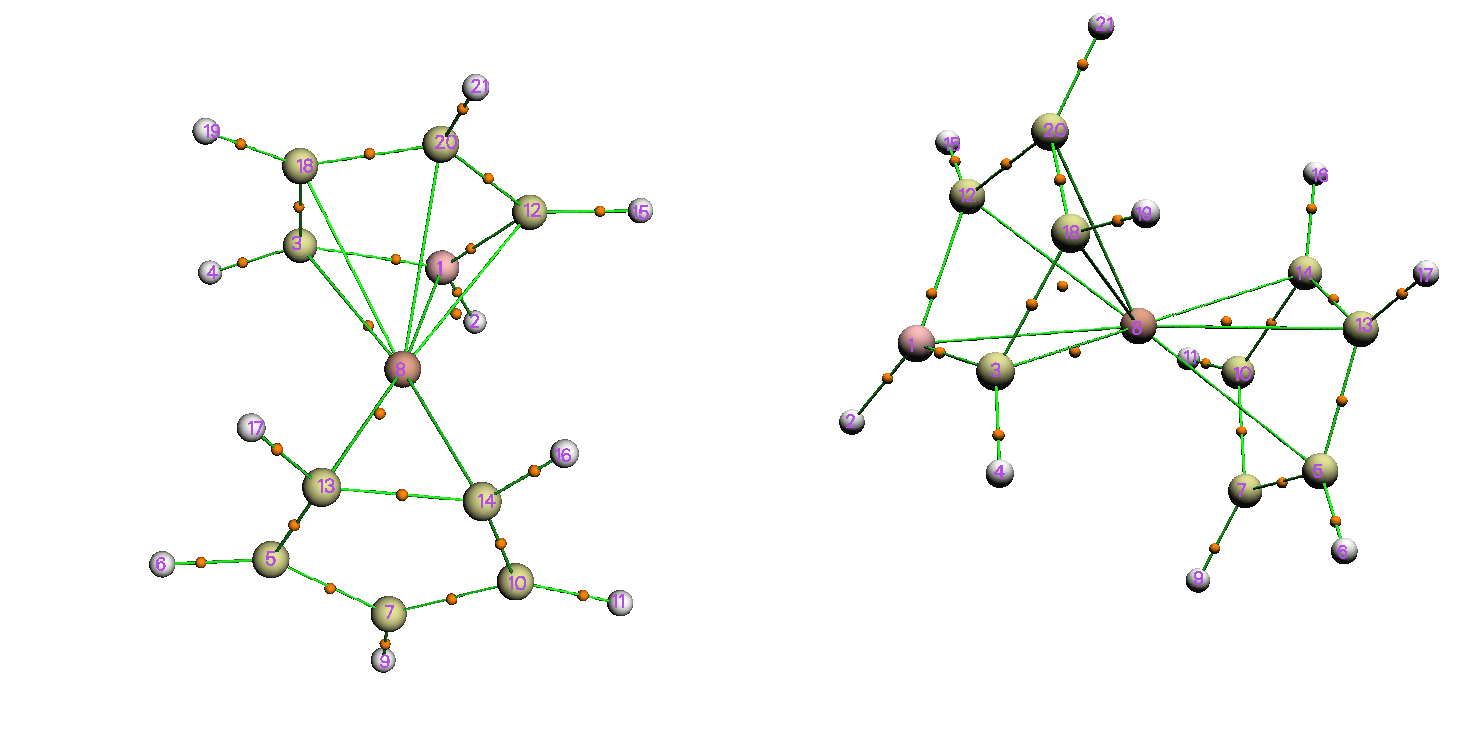
Bond Critical Point analysis on (C_{4}BH_{5})Al(C_{5}H_{5}). Note that bond critical points are represented by the orange dots. C_{α} and C_{β} are numbered (3, 12 ) and (18, 20) respectively. Left: Back view. Right: Side view. Molecules were optimised using BP86 functional and def2-TZVPP basis sets and analyses performed with multiwfn.

In contrast, the gallium analogue forms a Lewis-base adduct with a dative Ga−B bond rather than the neutral heteroleptic case for Aluminium, suggesting that Ga still retains the +1 oxidation state.

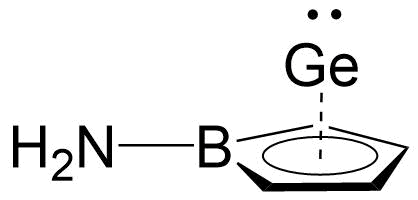
Model complex used for quantum chemical calculations

Furthermore, synthetic evidence for a neutral η^{5}-aminoborole germanium(II) complex half sandwich has been reported as illustrated to the right. Tholen et al. performed DFT calculations at the M06-2X/Def2-TZVP level of theory and determined that the model complex matched up closely with experimental data determined experimentally by X-Ray Diffraction (XRD), with a maximum of 1.6% deviation in atomic distances and angles. Using the model compound, its frontier orbitals were calculated and they reveal covalent bonding interactions between the apical germanium atom and the borole base. As shown in the figure to the right, the HOMO is mainly located at the nitrogen atom while HOMO-1 and HOMO-2 are bonding combinations of germanium 4p_{x} and 4p_{y} orbitals with the π orbitals of the borole ring. HOMO-3 is the antibonding combination of mainly the germanium 4s and 4p_{z} orbitals and the lowest π orbital of the borole ring.

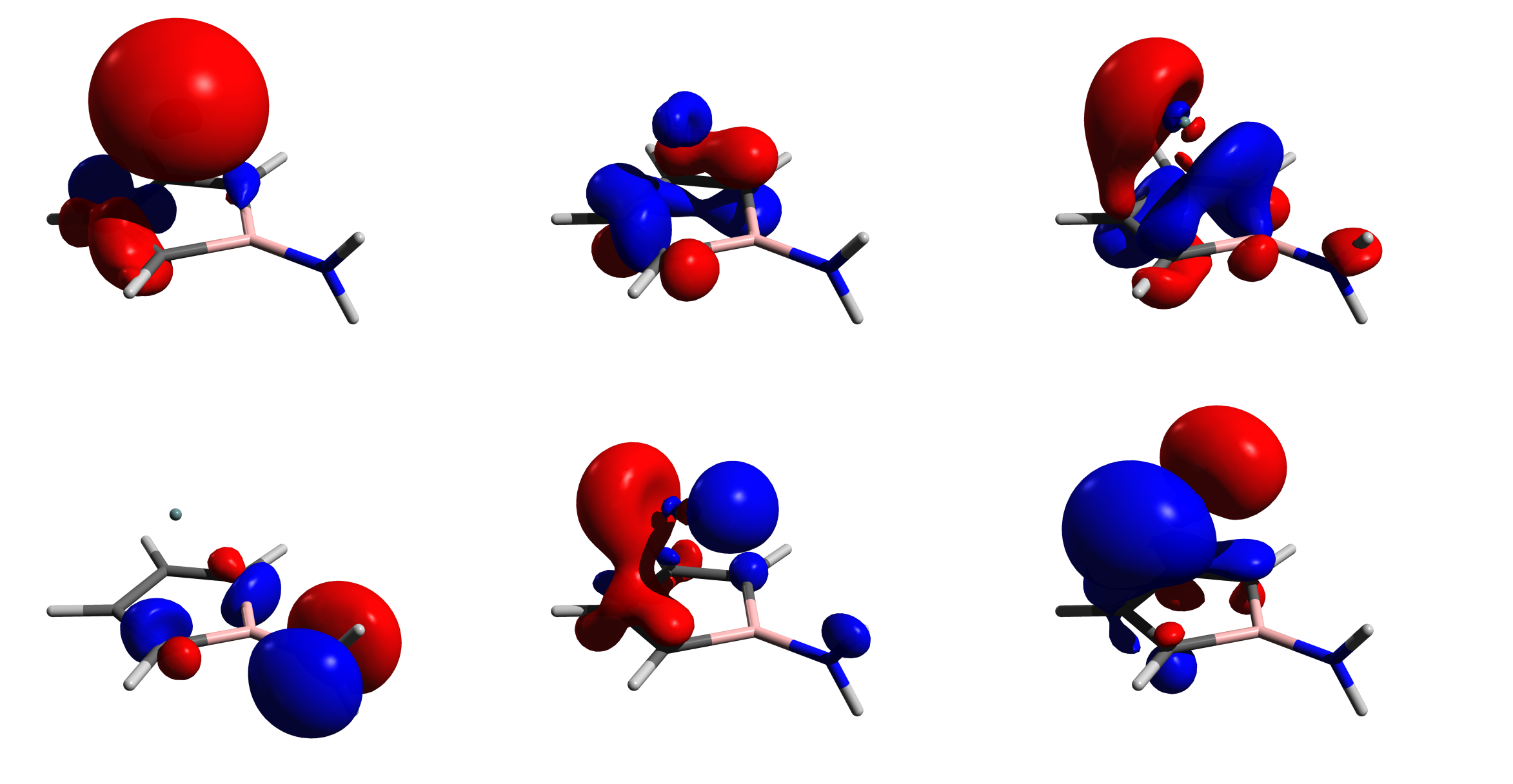
Isosurfaces of Germanium borole complex at 0.05. Top left to right: HOMO-3, HOMO-2, HOMO-1. Bottom left to right: HOMO, LUMO LUMO+1

Performing natural bond analysis (NBO) on the model pointed to significant orbital interactions between the apical germanium atom and the borole basis as reflected by Wiberg bond indices (WBIs) between the ring carbon and boron atoms and the apical germanium atom (between 0.31 and 0.42). For reference, these values are very similar to those of the germanium (II) Cp* cation complex (WBI(GeC)=0.29) and significantly larger than those between lithium ions and the ring atoms of the borole ring in the inverse sandwich complex Li_{2}[H_{2}NBC_{4}H_{4}]. Ionic interactions prevail (WBI(LiC)=WBI(LiB)=0.02) in the latter complex. While the calculated charge distribution for Li_{2}[H_{2}NBC_{4}H_{4}] has an expected highly negative charge (−1.90 a.u.) on the aminoborole unit, the same unit has a much less negative charge in the aminoborole germanium complex (−0.83 a.u.). The increased charge transfer from the aminoborole unit to the germanium atom is also reflected by the uniformly smaller WBI indices between the ring atoms compared those in Li_{2}[H_{2}NBC_{4}H_{4}]. In line with the NBO analysis results, quantum theory of atoms in molecules (QTAIM) analysis predicted a cage-like molecular topology for the model compound, with bond paths between all ring carbon atoms and the germanium atom as shown below.

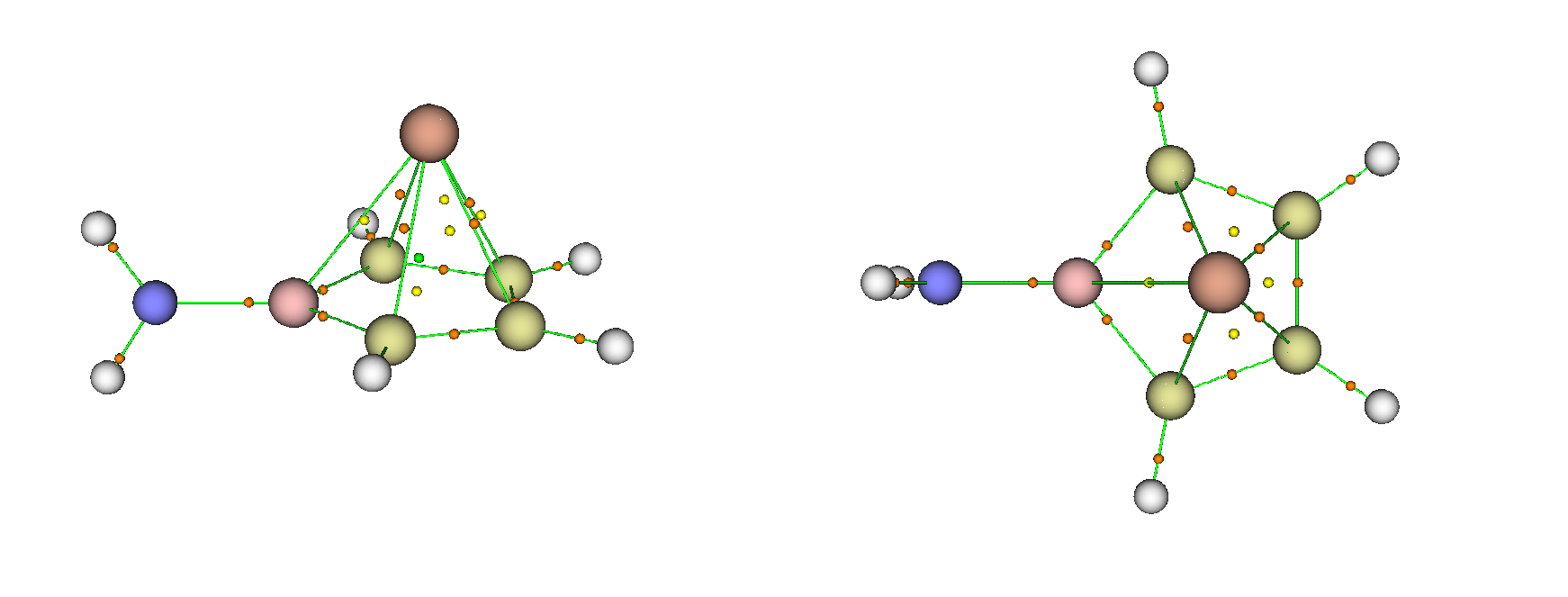
Topology Analysis of the model germanium half sandwich complex. Bond CP (3, -1): Orange. Ring CP (3, +1): Yellow. Cage CP (3, +3): Green. Left: Side view. Right: Top view.

Further theoretical studies have also been conducted at the M06-2X/Def2-TZVP level of theory to investigate the stability of half sandwich complexes between C_{4}H_{4}BNH_{2} with other group 14 elements (C, Si, Sn, Pb), where the borole ring binds to the divalent metal cation in η^{5} mode. AIM analysis was performed and the laplacian for C is < 0, while the other group 14 elements had values > 0. The former indicates a substantial amount of covalency, while the latter confirms the presence of a polar covalent interaction.

== See also ==
- Organoboron chemistry
