= Stibole =

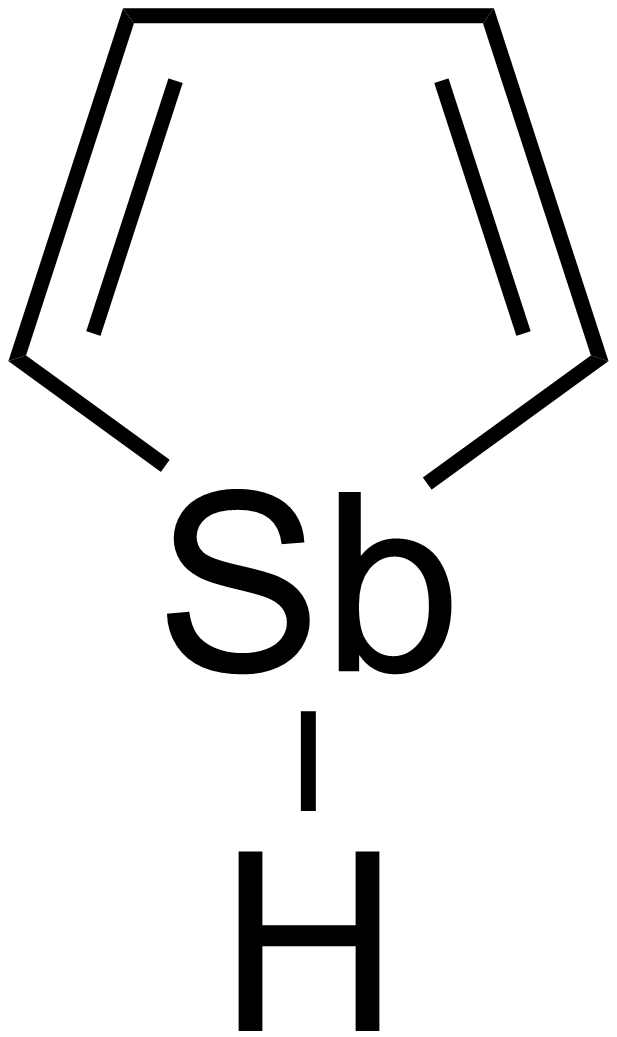

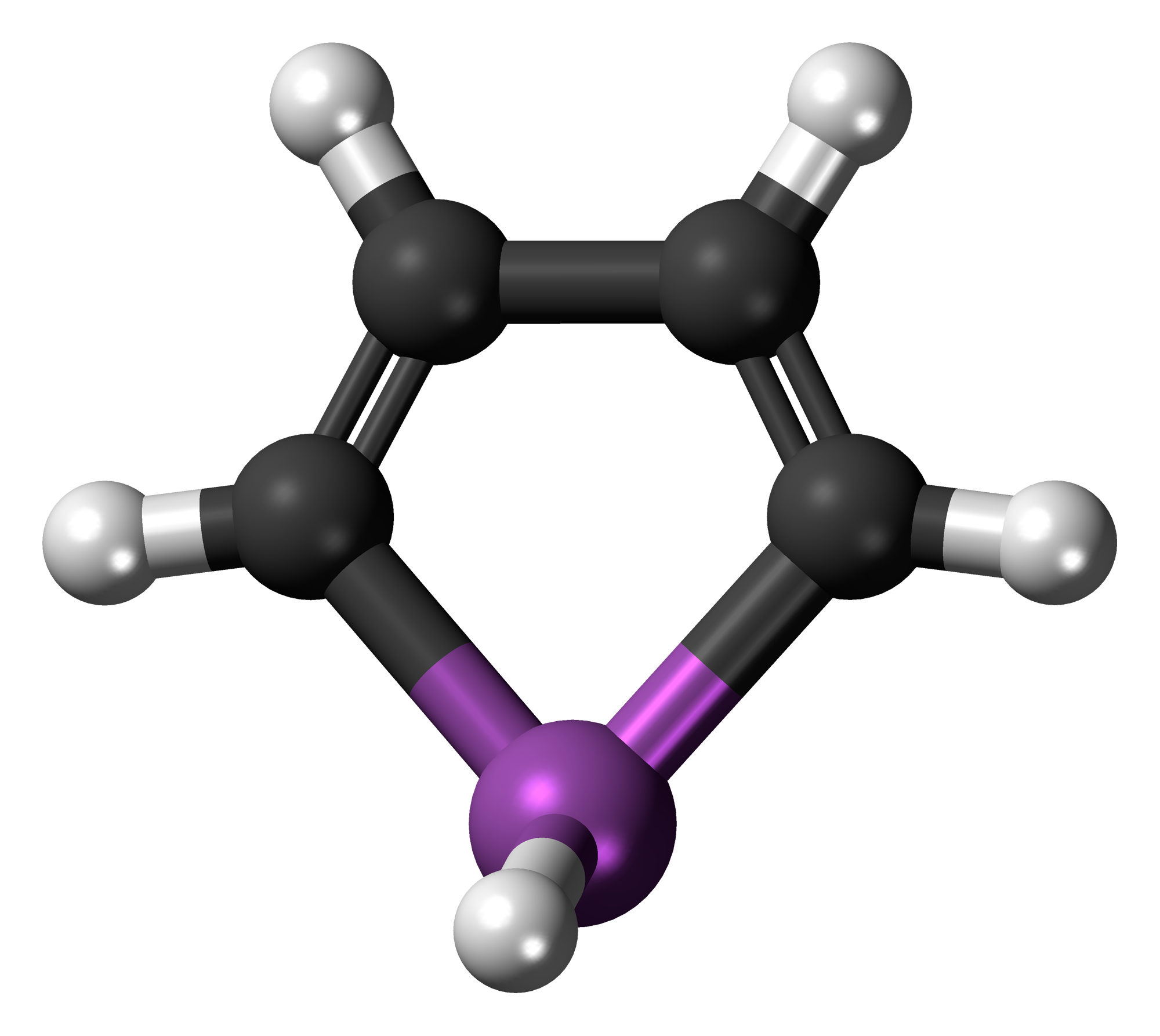

Names
- Preferred IUPAC name 1H-Stibole

Identifiers
CAS Number	288-04-0
3D model (JSmol)	Interactive image
ChemSpider	58539793
PubChem CID	91869492
CompTox Dashboard (EPA)	DTXSID101029323
- InChI: InChI=1S/C4H4.Sb.H/c1-3-4-2;;/h1-4H;; Key: BTXJFXLZTKRZGF-UHFFFAOYSA-N
- SMILES: [SbH]1C=CC=C1

Properties
Chemical formula	C_{4}H_{5}Sb
Molar mass	174.844 g·mol^{−1}

Related compounds
Related compounds	Pyrrole, phosphole, arsole, bismole
- Except where otherwise noted, data are given for materials in their standard state (at 25 °C [77 °F], 100 kPa). Infobox references

Stibole is a heterocyclic organic compound, a five-membered ring with the formula C_{4}H_{4}SbH. It is classified as a metallole. It can be viewed as a structural analog of pyrrole, with antimony replacing the nitrogen atom of pyrrole. Stibole itself has not been isolated, but many substituted derivatives have been synthesized. They are called stiboles.

== Preparation ==
Pentaphenylstibile is prepared from 1,4-dilithio-1,2,3,4-tetraphenylbutadiene and phenylantimony dichloride by a salt metathesis reaction:

LiCPh=CPh−CPh=CPhLi + PhSbCl_{2} → Ph_{4}C_{4}SbPh + 2 LiCl (Ph = C_{6}H_{5})

Even simpler than the above, 1-phenylstibole can be prepared analgously from 1,4-dilithiobutadiene. It is yellow oil that resinifies at room temperature.

2,5-Dimethyl-1-phenyl-1H-stibole, for example, can be formed by the reaction of 1,1-dibutyl-2,5-dimethylstannole and dichlorophenylstibine.

== Derivatives ==
Stibolides (C_{4}R_{4}Sb^{−}) form half-sandwich compounds.

== See also ==
- Organoantimony chemistry
