= Flyover complex =

Structure of the flyover complex Fe_{2}(C_{4}H_{4}CO)(CO)_{6}, which has idealized C_{2}-symmetry.

In organometallic chemistry, a flyover complex features two metals bridged by the fragment OC(RC=CR)_{2}. Some flyover complexes are symmetrical and some are not.

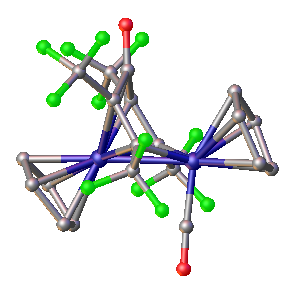
Structure of an asymmetrical flyover complex (C_{5}H_{5})_{2}Fe_{2}[(CCF_{3})_{4}CO]CO. The Fe-Fe bond length is 258.8 picometers.

Common examples are the iron carbonyl derivatives, which are typically air-stable, soluble in nonpolar solvents, and red-orange in color. These diiron complexes arise by the reaction of alkynes with iron carbonyls. Such reactions are known to generate many products, e.g. complexes of cyclopentadienones and para-quinones.

Some ferrole complexes react with tertiary phosphines to give the substituted flyover complex Fe_{2}(CO)_{5}(PR_{3})(C_{4}R_{4}CO). They insert alkynes en route to tropones (R_{6}C_{7}O).
