= Phosphole =

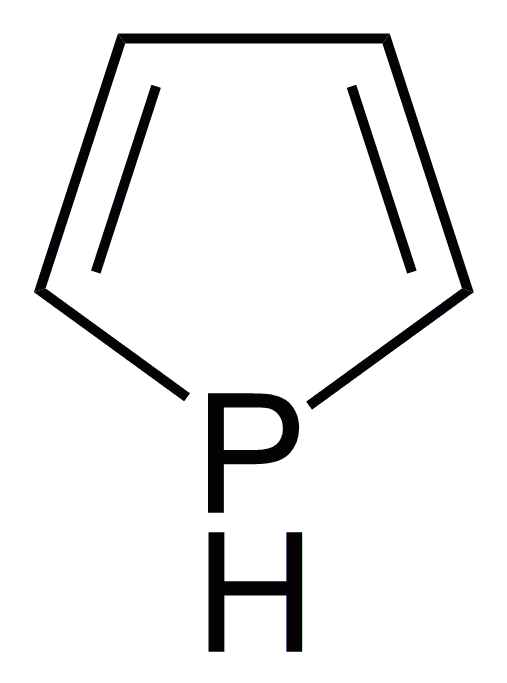

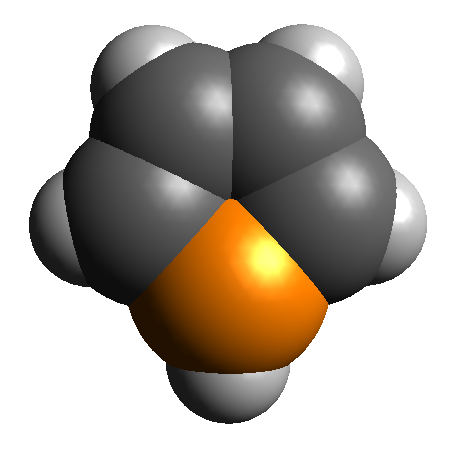

Names
- Preferred IUPAC name 1H-Phosphole

Identifiers
CAS Number	288-01-7
3D model (JSmol)	Interactive image
Beilstein Reference	969375
ChEBI	CHEBI:33134
ChemSpider	144273
PubChem CID	164575
CompTox Dashboard (EPA)	DTXSID60182977
- InChI: InChI=1S/C4H5P/c1-2-4-5-3-1/h1-5H
- SMILES: P1C=CC=C1

Properties
Chemical formula	C_{4}H_{5}P
Molar mass	84.058 g·mol^{−1}

Related compounds
Related compounds	Pyrrole, bismole, arsole, stibole; phosphorine
- Except where otherwise noted, data are given for materials in their standard state (at 25 °C [77 °F], 100 kPa). Infobox references

Phosphole is the organic compound with the chemical formula C_{4}H_{4}PH; it is the phosphorus analog of pyrrole. The term phosphole also refers to substituted derivatives of the parent heterocycle. These compounds are of theoretical interest but also serve as ligands for transition metals and as precursors to more complex organophosphorus compounds.

Triphosphole, C_{2}H_{3}P_{3}, is a heterocycle with 3 phosphorus atoms.

Pentaphosphole, P_{5}H, is a cyclic compound with 5 phosphorus atoms.

== Structure and bonding ==
Unlike the related 5-membered group 15 heterocycle pyrrole the aromaticity of phospholes is diminished, reflecting the reluctance of phosphorus to delocalise its lone pair. The main indication of this difference is the pyramidalisation of phosphorus. The absence of aromaticity is also indicated by the reactivity of phospholes.

Contrariwise, deprotonation at phosphorus gives the highly aromatic phospholyl [sic] anion.

== Preparation ==
The parent phosphole was first described in 1983, prepared by low-temperature protonation of lithium phospholide. Pentaphenylphosphole was reported in 1953. One route to phospholes is via the McCormack reaction, involving the addition of a 1,3-diene to a phosphonous chloride (RPCl_{2}) followed by dehydrohalogenation. Phenylphospholes can be prepared via zirconacyclopentadienes by reaction with PhPCl_{2}. Alternatively, phospholes can be generated from addition to a (conjugated) diyne. Radical or strongly basic conditions add phenylphosphine in conjugate across the two triple bonds, and electron-poor alkynes add to organophosphite esters to give phospholes.

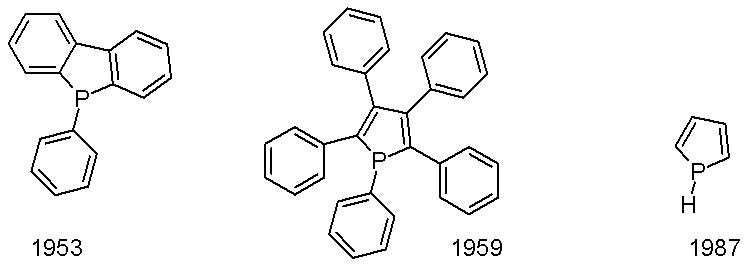

== Reactivity ==
Phospholes undergo different cycloaddition reactions; coordination properties of phospholes are also well studied.

The behavior of the secondary phospholes, those with P−H bond, is dominated by the reactivity of this bond. They readily rearrange by migration of H from P to carbon 2, followed by dimerisation. The corresponding anions are strong acids, not protonating in water.

Most phospholes are tertiary, typically P-methyl or P-phenyl. The weak aromaticity of these phospholes is manifested in their reactivity: for example, phospholes are basic at P, and serve as ligands, although they are less basic than divinylphosphines and quaternize slowly. With strong dienophiles (e.g., electrophilic alkynes) they undergo Diels–Alder reactions and "upon oxidation, sulfurization, quaternization, or complexation of the phosphole lone pair, the reactivity of the dienic system sharply increases as expected". P−C bonds remain intact in most reactions, but 7-phosphanorbornadiene oxides eliminate the corresponding phosphonous anhydride to give the benzene.

λ^{5} coordination at P is also possible, although orbital overlap with the adjacent π orbitals means that such substituents tend to migrate to the adjacent carbon atoms. Phospholes react with nucleophilic acids to give the corresponding phospholene, as though they were protonated at the 2-carbon, but in fact the process is an oxidative addition to phosphorus to give a λ^{5} phosphorane, followed by hydrogen migration.

Electrophilic substitution onto phospholes is difficult and rare. Organolithium compounds can displace a substituent from P in "clean nucleophilic attacks at phosphorus" or add in conjugate to give the corresponding phospholene. Friedel-Crafts acylation occurs to phospholes coordinated to =Mo(CO)_{5}, but not Vilsmeier-Haack formylation.

2,5-Diphenyl phospholes can be functionalised by deprotonation followed by P-acylation then a 1H, 2H, 3H phospholide equilibrium resulting in a 1:3 shift of the acyl group.

Phospholes can also be turned into β-functional phosphabenzenes via functionalisation by imidoyl chloride and insertion. In general, phosphole oxides are stable only when pentasubstituted, otherwise forming a dimer with substantial angle strain at P.

== See also ==
- Benzophosphole
- Metallole
- Organophosphorus compound
- Phosphorine, C_{5}H_{5}P
