= Metallabenzene =

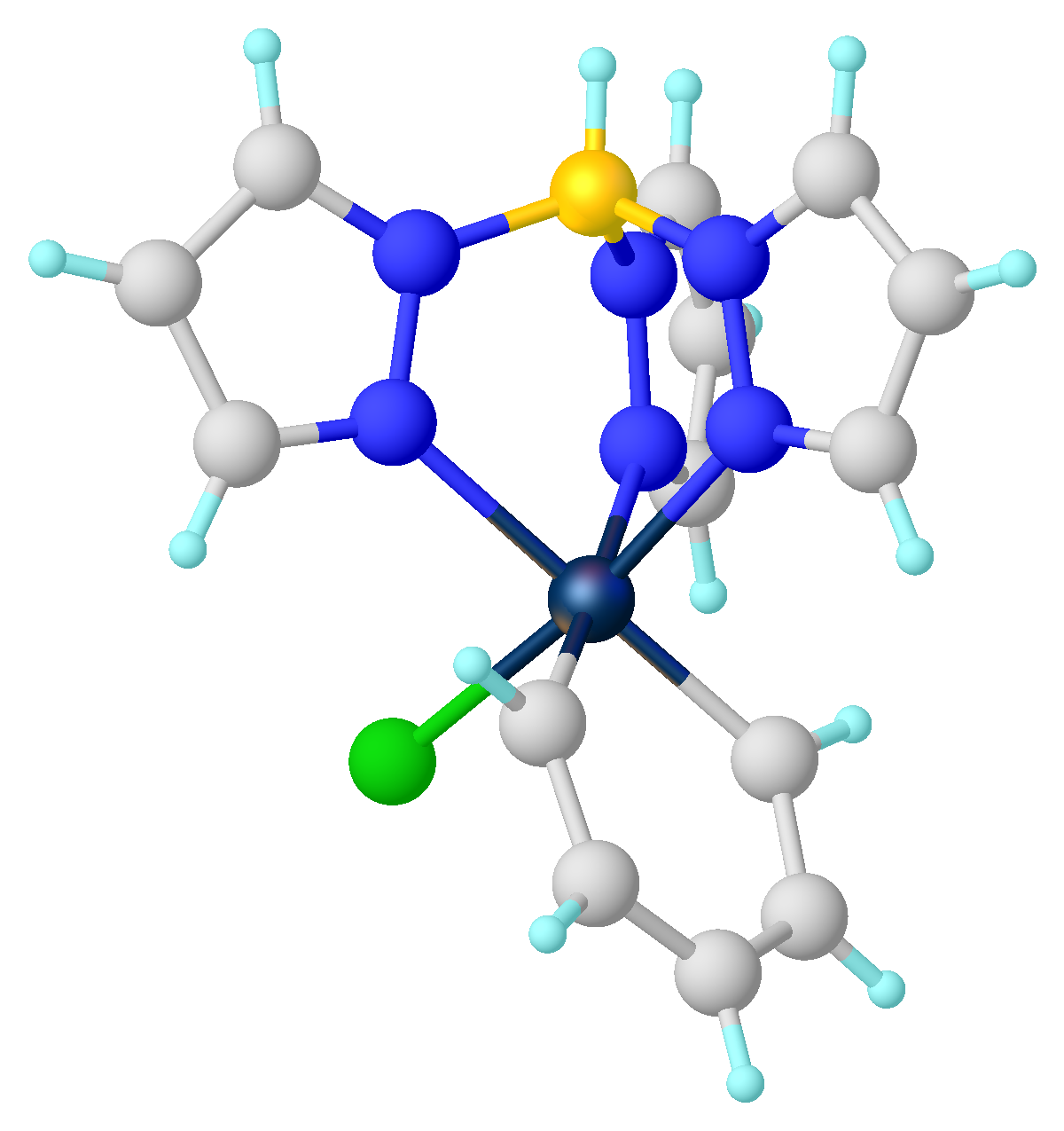
Structure of the metallabenzene TpIrC_{5}H_{5}(Cl)

The metallabenzenes are class of chemical compound of the form L_{n}M(CH)_{5}, or derivatives thereof. Most metallabenzenes do not feature the M(CH)_{5} ring itself, but, instead, some of the H atoms are replaced by other substituents. The parent metallabenzenes can be viewed as derivatives of benzene wherein a CH center has been replaced by a transition metal complex.

== Classification ==
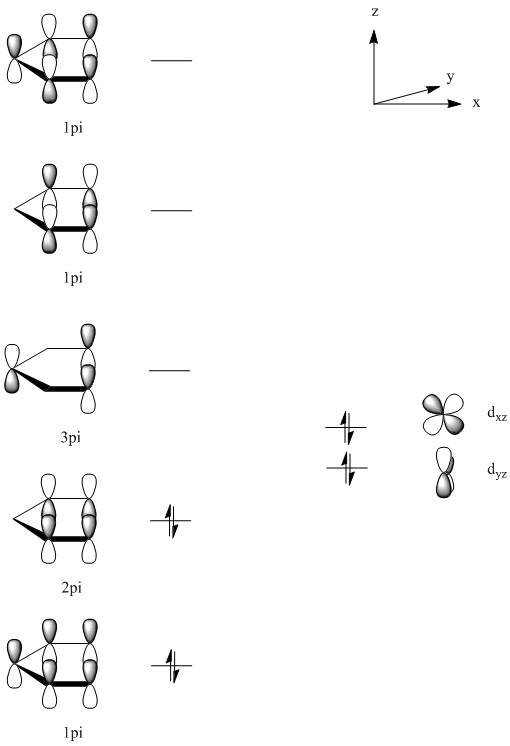
Interactions between these orbitals give rise to a cyclically delocalized pi electronic structure.

All known metallabenzenes are 18-electron complexes, and have been classified into three varieties. In modeling metallabenzenes, the parent acyclic hydrocarbon ligand is viewed as the anion C_{5}H_{5}^{−}.

Early computations suggested that the six π-electrons in the metallacycle conform to the Hückel (4n+2) theory; however, interactions with an additional d orbital suggest that metallabenzenes may instead be an 8-π Möbius aromat.

Specifically (see Fig. 4 in the cited paper but not the pictures here, which use different notation), suppose the ring is located in the xy plane with y-axis radial to the ring at the metal center. Then there are two interactions between the π system and the metal center. In one interaction, Hückel orbitals treat the two lobes of the d_{yz} orbital inside the ring as though a main-group π orbital; the antiphase combination is the metallabenzene LUMO. The other interaction begins with the filled pure-ligand Hückel orbital, an antiphase combination of the two π bonds α-β to the metal. That ligand orbital is split by interaction with the d_{xz} orbital, whose four lobes are all circumferential and effect a Möbius twist. The antiphase combination is the metallabenzene HOMO.

Still other authors instead argue that metallabenzenes are Hückel aromats but with 10 π-electrons.

Also, a large number of multinuclear metal complexes can be notionally decomposed into a metallabenzene ligand facially coordinated to another metal center.

== Preparation and structure ==
The first reported stable metallabenzene was the osmabenzene Os(C_{5}H_{4}S)CO(PPh_{3})_{2}, produced from double addition of acetylene to the corresponding thiocarbonyl complex. Characteristic of other metallaarenes, the Os-C bonds are about 0.6 Å longer than the C-C bonds (in benzene these are 1.39 Å), resulting in a distortion of the hexagonal ring. ^{1}H NMR signals for the ring protons are downfield, consistent with aromatic "ring current", and the ring readily undergoes electrophilic aromatic substitution. Osmabenzene and its derivatives can be regarded as an Os(II), d^{6} octahedral complex.

Metallabenzenes have also been characterized with metals ruthenium, iridium, platinum, and rhenium. The iridabenzenes can be produced from ligand substitution, with a 3-vinylcyclopropene-derived terminal carbanion or a linear (CH)^{−}_{5}-skeletal carbanion displacing an X-type ligand. As of 2020, there remained no general method for the synthesis of metallabenzenes, with most techniques applicable to only two or three metals.

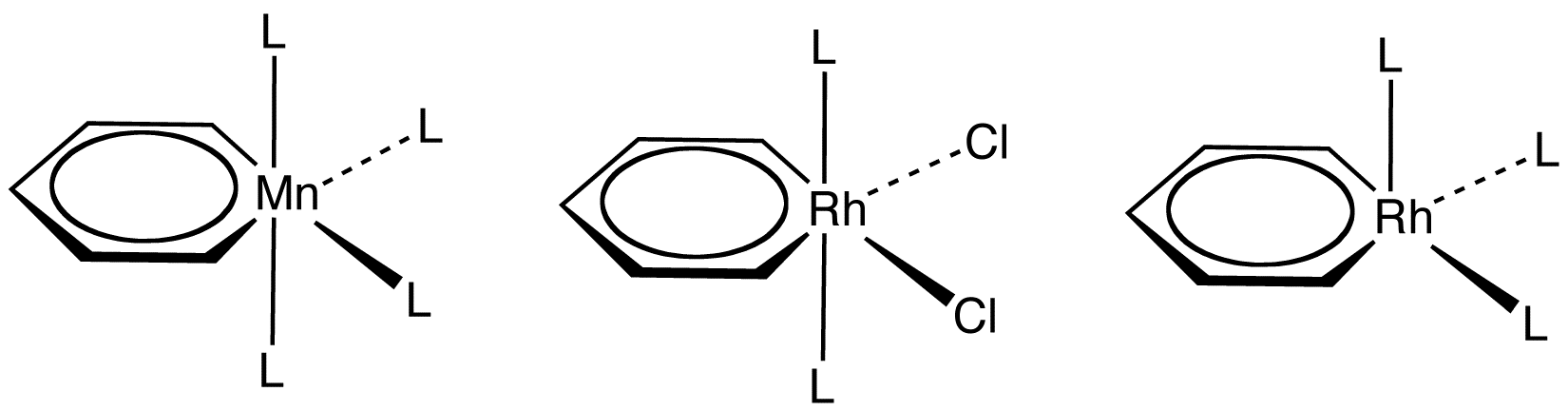
Three classes of stable metallabenzenes.

Metallabenzenes typically exhibit a slight nonplanarity, with the metal nucleus shifted perpendicular to the ring plane. However, ligands that strongly accept π electrons reduce the nonplanarity. These geometric effects are one of the pieces of evidence suggesting that metallabenzenes are Möbius aromats, not Hückel ones.
