= Arsole =

Chemical compound

Structural formula of arsole with an implicit hydrogen
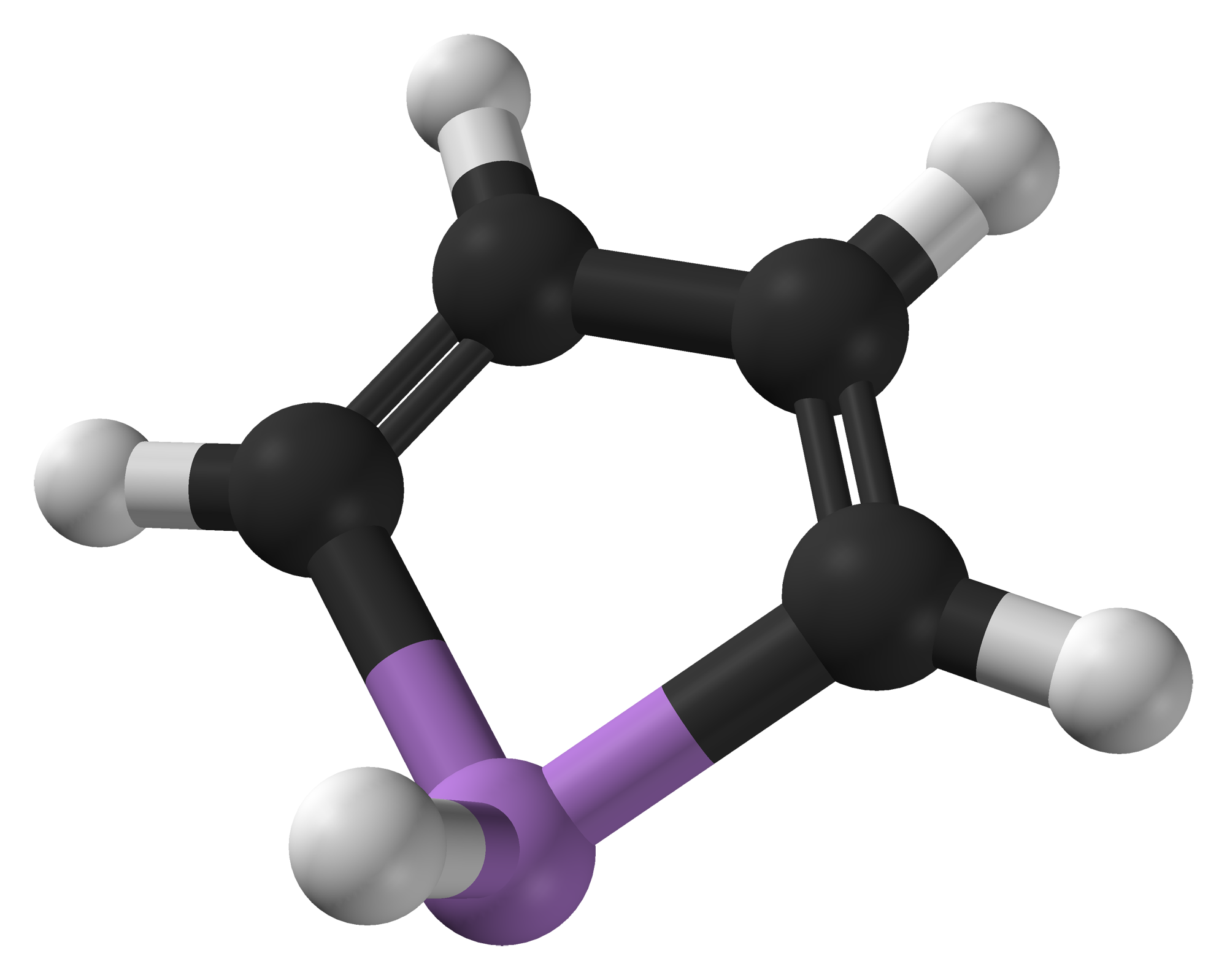
Ball-and-stick model of the arsole molecule

Names
- Preferred IUPAC name 1H-Arsole
- Other names Arsenole; Arsacyclopentadiene

Identifiers
CAS Number	287-77-4
3D model (JSmol)	Interactive image
ChEBI	CHEBI:33131
ChemSpider	16787685
PubChem CID	6398625
UNII	AH6RG8546R
CompTox Dashboard (EPA)	DTXSID20423217
- InChI: InChI=1S/C4H5As/c1-2-4-5-3-1/h1-5H Key: NXHAKHHKDBVHPV-UHFFFAOYSA-N; InChI=1/C4H5As/c1-2-4-5-3-1/h1-5H Key: NXHAKHHKDBVHPV-UHFFFAOYAK
- SMILES: [AsH]1C=CC=C1

Properties
Chemical formula	C_{4}H_{5}As
Molar mass	128.00 g mol^{−1}

Related compounds
Related compounds	Pyrrole, phosphole, bismole, stibole
- Except where otherwise noted, data are given for materials in their standard state (at 25 °C [77 °F], 100 kPa). verify (what is ?) Infobox references

Arsole, also called arsenole or arsacyclopentadiene, is an organoarsenic compound with the formula C_{4}H_{5}As. It is classified as a metallole and is valence isoelectronic to and related to pyrrole except that an arsenic atom is substituted for the nitrogen atom. Whereas the pyrrole molecule is planar, the arsole molecule is not, and the hydrogen atom bonded to arsenic extends out of the molecular plane. Arsole is only moderately aromatic, with about 40% the aromaticity of pyrrole.

Arsole itself has not been reported in pure form, but several substituted analogs called arsoles exist. Arsoles and more complex arsole derivatives have similar structure and chemical properties to those of phosphole derivatives. When arsole is fused to a benzene ring, this molecule is called arsindole, or benzarsole.

== Nomenclature ==
Arsole belongs to the series of heterocyclic pnictogen compounds. The naming of cyclic organoarsenic compounds such as arsole is based on an extension of the Hantzsch–Widman nomenclature system approved by IUPAC, as summarized below:

Ring size	Unsaturated ring	Saturated ring
3	Arsirene	Arsirane
4	Arsete	Arsetane
5	Arsole	Arsolane
6	Arsinine	Arsinane
7	Arsepine	Arsepane
8	Arsocine	Arsocane
9	Arsonine	Arsonane
10	Arsecine	Arsecane

Because of its similarity to the English slang word "arsehole" (in common use outside North America), the name "arsole" has been considered a target of fun, a "silly name", and one of several chemical compounds with an unusual name. However, this "silly name" coincidence has also stimulated detailed scientific studies.

== Properties ==
Calculated geometry and inversion barrier energy E for some C_{4}H_{4}MH molecules
M	d(M-C), Å	d(M-H), Å	α(C-M-C), °	E, kJ/mol
N	1.37	1.01	110	0
P	1.81	1.425	90.5	67
As	1.94	1.53	86	125
Sb	2.14	1.725	80.5	160
Bi	2.24	1.82	78	220

Arsole itself has not been isolated experimentally yet, but the molecular geometry and electronic configuration of arsole have been studied theoretically. Calculations also addressed properties of simple arsole derivatives, where hydrogen atoms are substituted by other atoms or small hydrocarbon groups, and there are experimental reports on chemical properties of more complex arsole derivatives. The situation is similar for other C_{4}H_{4}MH metalloles where M = P, As, Sb and Bi.

=== Planarity ===
Calculations suggest that whereas pyrrole (C_{4}H_{4}NH) molecule is planar, phosphole (C_{4}H_{4}PH) and heavier metalloles are not, and their pnictogen-bonded hydrogen atom extends out of plane. A similar tendency is predicted for the fluorinated C_{4}F_{4}MH derivatives (M = N, P, As, ..), but the inversion barriers are about 50–100% higher. The planarity is lost even in pyrrole when its nitrogen-bonded hydrogen atom is substituted, e.g., with fluorine. However, the planarity is evaluated in calculation by the energy required to convert between the two configurations where the M-H bond is extending left or right from the molecular plane. However, non-zero (small) value of this energy does not necessarily mean the molecule has low symmetry, because of the possibility of thermal or quantum tunneling between the two configurations.

=== Aromaticity ===
Aromaticity of the arsole manifests itself in delocalization and resonance of its ring electrons. It is closely related to planarity in that the more planar the molecule the stronger its aromaticity. Aromaticity of arsole and its derivatives has been debated for years both from experimental and theoretical points of view. A 2005 review combined with quantum chemical calculations concluded that arsole itself is "moderately" aromatic as its ring current is 40% that of pyrrole, which is known to be aromatic. However, comparable ring current was calculated for cyclopentadiene, which has long been regarded as non-aromatic. Other reports suggest that the aromaticity (and planarity) can vary between arsole derivatives.

=== Chemical properties (arsole derivatives) ===
Chemical properties of arsole derivatives have been studied experimentally; they are similar to those of phosphole and its derivatives. Substitution of all hydrogen atoms in arsole with phenyl groups yields yellow needles of crystalline pentaphenylarsole, which has a melting point of 215 °C. This complex can be prepared, at a yield of 50–93%, by reacting 1,4-diiodo-1,2,3,4-tetraphenylbutadiene or 1,4-dilithio-1,2,3,4-tetraphenylbutadiene with phenylarsenous dichloride (C_{6}H_{5}AsCl_{2}) in ether.

Substituting in this reaction arsenic trichloride for phenylarsenous dichloride yields 1-chloro-2,3,4,5-tetraphenylarsole, which also forms yellow needles but with a lower melting point of 182–184 °C. Pentaphenylarsole can further be oxidized with hydrogen peroxide resulting in yellow crystals with melting point of 252 °C. It can also be reacted with iron pentacarbonyl (Fe(CO)_{5}) in isooctane at 150 °C to yield a solid organoarsenic compound with the formula C_{34}H_{25}As,Fe(CO)_{3}. Reacting pentaphenylarsole with metallic lithium or potassium yields 1,2,3-triphenyl naphthalene.

Reaction of phenylarsenous dichloride with linear diphenyls results in 1,2,5-triphenylarsole (see below), a solid with a melting point of about 170 °C. This compound forms various anions upon treatment with alkali metals.

== See also ==
- Pyrrole, a nitrogen analog.
- Furan, an oxygen analog.
- Thiophene, a sulfur analog.
- Simple aromatic rings
- Varsol, a petroleum distillate with a boiling range of 150–200 °C.
