= Metallacyclopentanes =

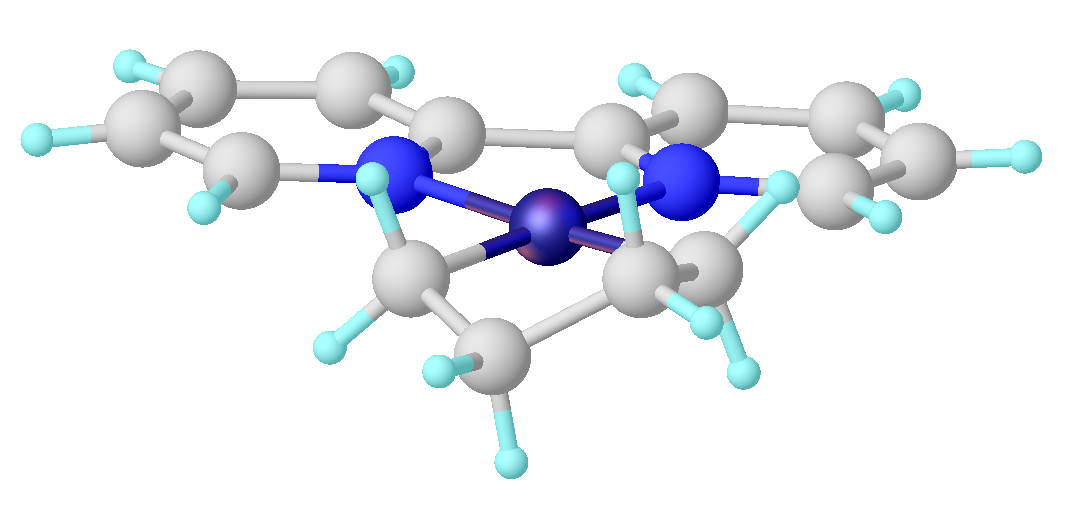
Structure of the nickelacyclopentane Ni(bipyridine)(CH_{2})_{4}.

In organometallic chemistry, metallacyclopentanes are compounds with the formula L_{n}M(CH_{2})_{4} (L_{n} = ligands, and M = metal). They are a type of metallacycle. Metallacyclopentanes are intermediates in some metal-catalysed reactions in homogeneous catalysis.

== Synthesis ==
Traditionally, metallacyclopentanes are prepared by dialkylation of metal dihalides with 1,4‐bis(bromomagnesio)butane or the related dilithio reagent. The complex Ni(bipyridine)C_{4}H_{8} is prepared by the oxidative addition of 1,4-dibromobutane to Ni(0) precursors. Metallacyclopentanes also arise via the dimerization of ethylene within the coordination sphere of a low-valence metal center. This reaction is relevant to the catalytic production of butenes and related alkenes.

== Structure ==
Unsubstituted metallacyclopentanes adopt conformations related to cyclopentane itself: open-envelope conformation and a twisted open-envelope structure.

== Occurrence ==
The first reported metallacylopentane is Fe(CO)_{4}C_{4}F_{8}, obtained from Fe(CO)_{5} and tetrafluoroethylene.

Examples of metallacyclopentanes come from studies of the Ni-catalyzed linear- and cyclo-dimerization of ethylenes. Linear dimerization proceeds via beta-hydride elimination of the nickelacyclopentane (Ph_{3}P)Ni(CH_{2})_{4} whereas cyclodimerization to give cyclobutane proceeds by reductive elimination from the related (Ph_{3}P)_{2}Ni(CH_{2})_{4}. Another example of a metallacyclopentane is the titanocene derivative Cp_{2}Ti(CH_{2})_{4}.

Metallacyclopentanes are intermediates in the metal-catalysed dimerization, trimerization, and tetramerization of ethylene to give 1-butene, 1-hexene, and 1-octene, respectively. These compounds are of commercial interest as comonomers, used in the production of polyethylene.

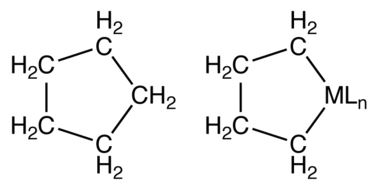
Cyclopentane and metallacyclopentane

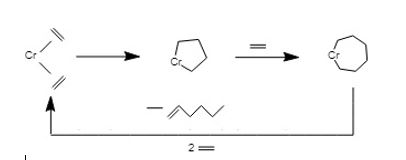
The chromium-catalyzed trimerization

In the evolution of heterogeneous alkene metathesis catalysts, metallacyclopentanes are invoked as intermediates in the formation of metal alkylidenes from ethylene. Thus, metallacyclopentane intermediates are proposed to isomerize to metallacyclobutanes, which can eliminate alkene giving the alkylidene.

== See also ==
- Metallole
