= Benzophosphole =

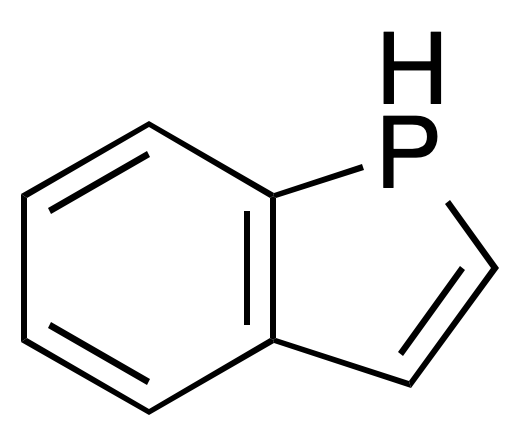

Names
- Preferred IUPAC name 1H-Phosphindole

Identifiers
CAS Number	272-10-6
3D model (JSmol)	Interactive image
ChemSpider	25935176
PubChem CID	15960798
CompTox Dashboard (EPA)	DTXSID501337253
- InChI: InChI=1S/C8H7P/c1-2-4-8-7(3-1)5-6-9-8/h1-6,9H Key: KHGHGZPESHUYCR-UHFFFAOYSA-N
- SMILES: C1=CC=C2C(=C1)C=CP2

Properties
Chemical formula	C_{8}H_{7}P
Molar mass	134.118 g·mol^{−1}

Related compounds
Related compounds	Indole, Phosphole, Benzofuran, Benzothiophene
- Except where otherwise noted, data are given for materials in their standard state (at 25 °C [77 °F], 100 kPa). Infobox references

Benzophosphole is the organic compound with the chemical formula C_{8}H_{7}P; it is the phosphorus analog of indole. The term benzophosphole also refers to substituted derivatives of the parent heterocycle.

== See also ==
- Organophosphorus chemistry
- Phosphole
- Indole
