= Metallacycle =

Cyclic compound with at least one metal atom in its ring structure

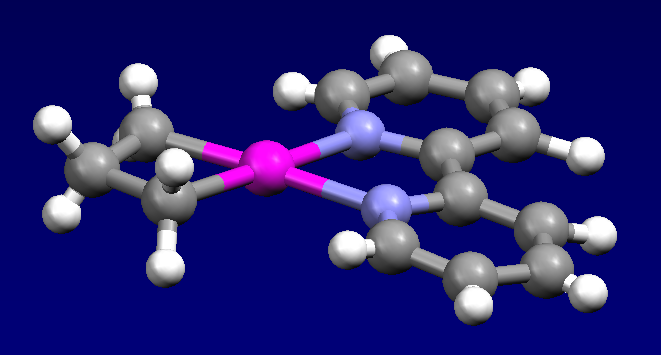
Structure of the platinacyclobutane complex PtC_{3}H_{6}(bipy) derived from activation of cyclopropane.

In organometallic chemistry, a metallacycle is a derivative of a carbocyclic compound wherein a metal has replaced at least one carbon center; this is to some extent similar to heterocycles. Metallacycles appear frequently as reactive intermediates in catalysis, e.g. olefin metathesis and alkyne trimerization. In organic synthesis, directed ortho metalation is widely used for the functionalization of arene rings via C-H activation. One main effect that metallic atom substitution on a cyclic carbon compound is distorting the geometry due to the large size of typical metals.

== Nomenclature ==
Metallacycles are cyclic compounds with two metal carbon bonds.

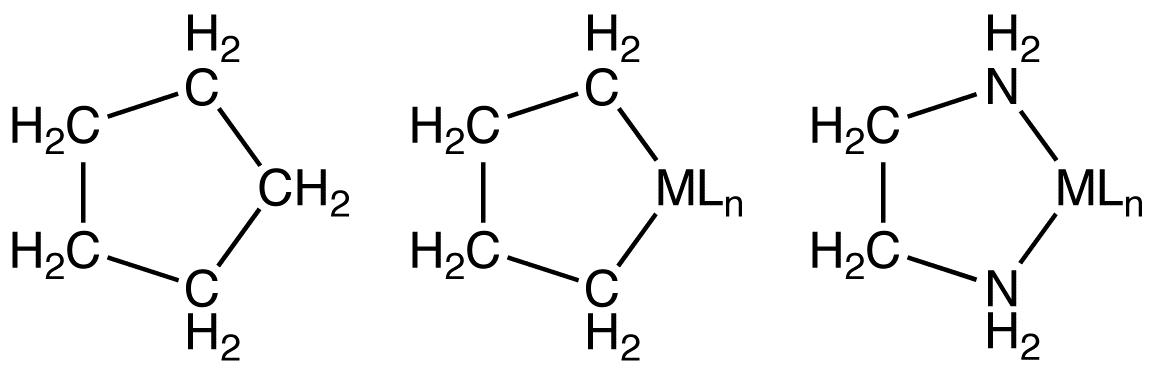
Structure of a carbocycle (cyclopentane), a metallacycle (a metallacyclopentane), and a metal chelated to ethylenediamine, a metal-containing ring that is not classified as a metallacycle

IUPAC defines metallacycloalkanes as "monocyclic compounds containing a metal atom and saturated carbon atoms as ring members". Many compounds containing metals in rings are known, for example chelate rings. Usually, such compounds are not classified as metallacycles, but the naming conventions are not rigidly followed. Within the area of coordination chemistry and supramolecular chemistry, examples include metallacrowns, metallacryptands, metallahelices, and molecular wheels.

== Classes of metallacycles ==
Metal-alkene complexes can be viewed as the smallest metallacycles, but they usually are not classified as metallacycles. In the Dewar–Chatt–Duncanson model, one resonance structure for the M(η^{2}-alkene) center is the metallacyclopropane.

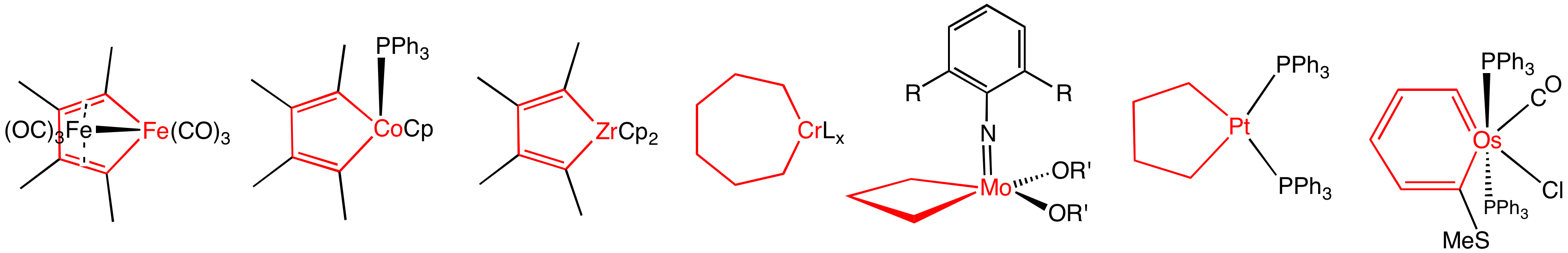
Representative metallacycles. From the left: a ferrole, a cobaltacyclopentadiene (a trapped intermediate from alkyne trimerization), zirconacyclopentadiene, chromacycloheptane (intermediate in trimerization of ethylene, L is unspecified), a molybdacyclobutane, a platinacyclopentane, and an osmabenzene

=== Metallacyclobutanes ===
The parent metallacyclobutane has the formula L_{n}M(CH_{2})_{3} where L is a ligand attached to M. A stable example is (PPh_{3})_{2}Pt(CH_{2})_{3}. The first example was prepared by oxidative addition of cyclopropane to platinum.

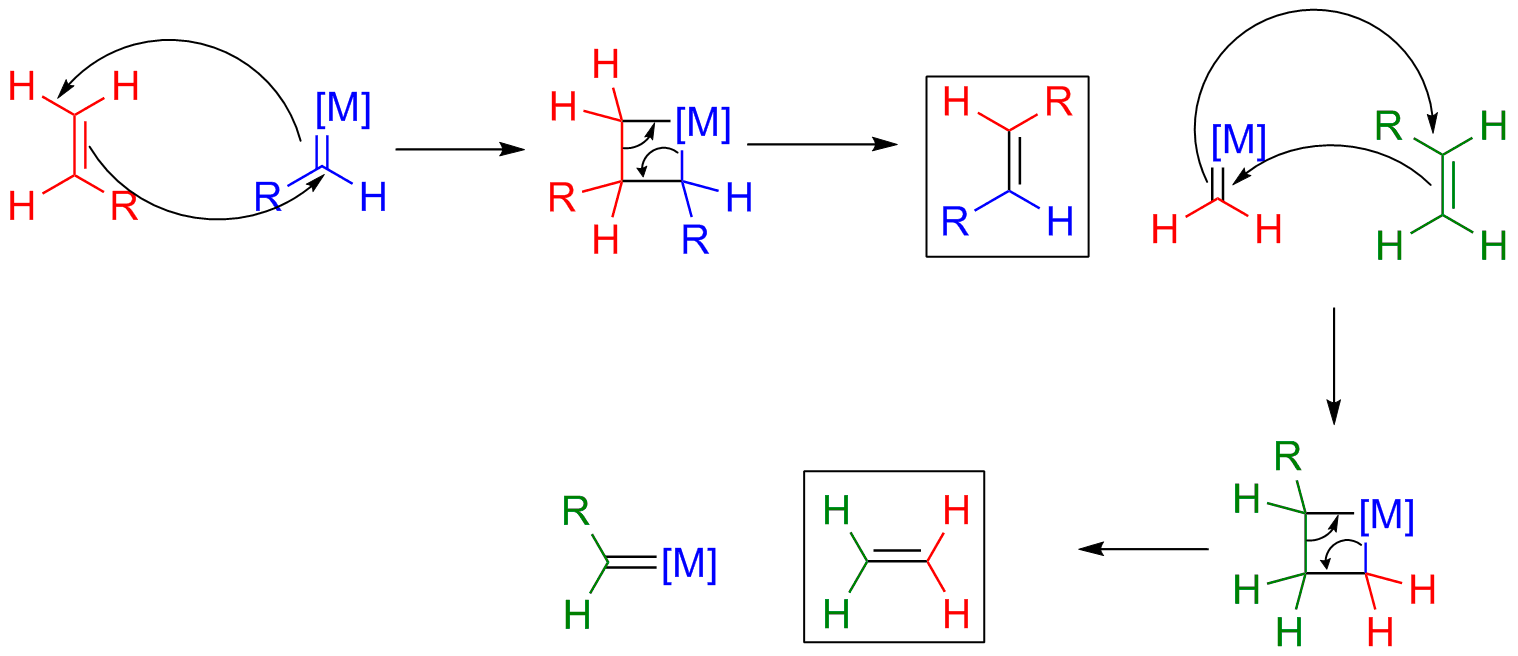
The Chauvin mechanism for olefin metathesis

Metallacyclobutane intermediates are involved in the alkene metathesis and in the oligomerization and dimerization of ethylene. In alkene metathesis, the Chauvin mechanism invokes the attack of an alkene at an electrophilic metal carbene catalyst. This work helped to validate the Chauvin mechanism for olefin metathesis.

=== Metallacyclopentadienes and metallabenzenes ===
The parent metallacyclopentadiene, or metallole, has the formula L_{n}M(CH)_{4}. Most arise from the coupling of two alkynes at a low valent metal centers such as derivatives of Co(I) and Zr(II). Late metal derivatives (Co, Ni) are intermediates in the metal-catalysed trimerization of alkynes to arenes. Early metal derivatives, i.e. derivatives of Ti and Zr, are used stoichiometrically. For example, the zirconacyclopentadiene Cp_{2}ZrC_{4}Me_{4} is a useful carrier for C_{4}Me_{4}^{2−}. Some of the oldest metallacycles are the ferroles, which are dimetallacyclopentadiene complexes of the formula Fe_{2}(C_{2}R_{4})(CO)_{6}. They are derived from coupling of alkynes as well as from the desulfurization of thiophenes.

The parent metallacyclobenzenes have the formula L_{n}M(CH)_{5}. They can be viewed as derivatives of benzene wherein a CH center has been replaced by a transition metal complex.

=== Metallacyclopentanes ===
The parent metallacyclopentane has the formula L_{n}M(CH_{2})_{4}. Such compounds are intermediates in the metal catalysed dimerization, trimerization, and tetramerization of ethylene to give but-1-ene, hex-1-ene and oct-1-ene, respectively. Metallacyclopentanes are invoked as intermediates in the evolution of heterogeneous alkene metathesis catalysts from ethylene and metal oxides. Metallacyclopentane intermediates are proposed to isomerize to metallacyclobutanes, which then eliminate propylene giving the alkylidene.

== Ortho-metalation ==
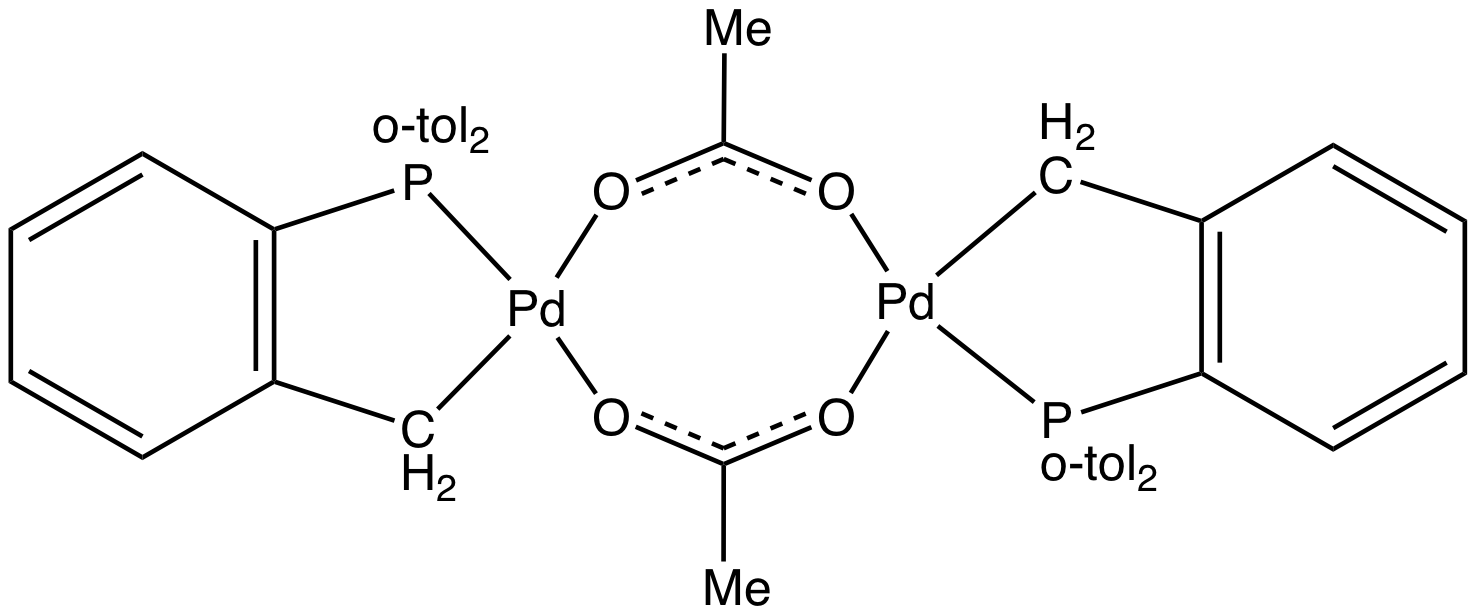
Structure of a palladacycle.

Metallacycles often arise by cyclization of arene-containing donor ligands, e.g. aryl phosphines and amines. An early example is the cyclization of IrCl(PPh_{3})_{3} to give the corresponding Ir(III) hydride containing a four-membered IrPCC ring. Palladium(II) and platinum(II) have long been known to ortho-metalate aromatic ligands such as azobenzene, benzylamines, and 2-phenylpyridines. These reactions are strongly influenced by substituent effects, including the Thorpe-Ingold effect. Ligands that lack aryl substituents will sometimes cyclometalate via activation of methyl groups, an early example being the internal oxidative addition of methylphosphine ligands. Metallacycle formation interferes with intermolecular C-H activation processes. For this reason, specialized "pincer ligands" ligands have been developed that resist ortho-metalation.
