= Bismole =

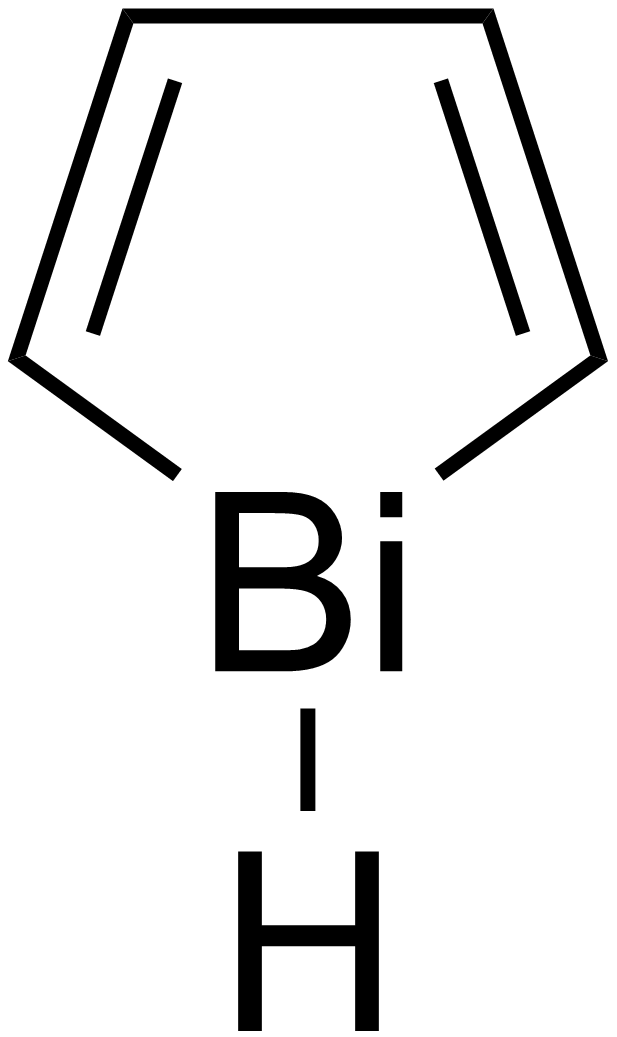

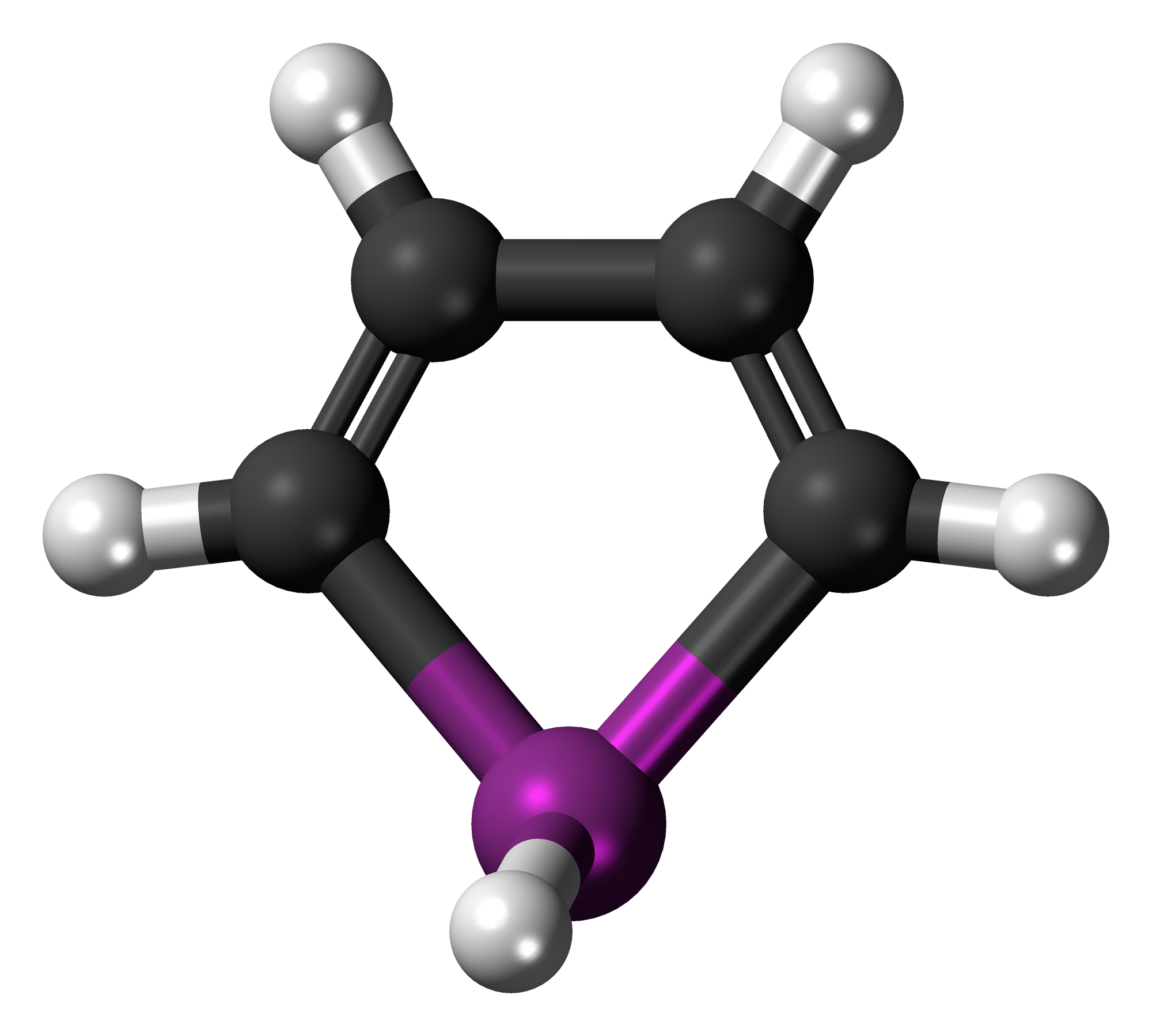

Names
- Preferred IUPAC name 1H-Bismole

Identifiers
CAS Number	89067-15-2
3D model (JSmol)	Interactive image
ChemSpider	24751865
PubChem CID	18969921
CompTox Dashboard (EPA)	DTXSID50596983
- InChI: InChI=1S/C4H4.Bi.H/c1-3-4-2;;/h1-4H;; Key: SUILZFJIVIXVOA-UHFFFAOYSA-N
- SMILES: C1=C[BiH]C=C1

Properties
Chemical formula	C_{4}H_{5}Bi
Molar mass	262.064 g·mol^{−1}

Related compounds
Related compounds	Pyrrole, phosphole, arsole, stibole
- Except where otherwise noted, data are given for materials in their standard state (at 25 °C [77 °F], 100 kPa). verify (what is ?) Infobox references

Bismole is a theoretical heterocyclic organic compound, a five-membered ring with the formula C_{4}H_{4}BiH. It is classified as a metallole. It can be viewed as a structural analog of pyrrole, with bismuth replacing the nitrogen atom of pyrrole. The unsubstituted compound has not been isolated due to the high energy of the Bi-H bond. Substituted derivatives, which have been synthesized, are called bismoles.

== Reactions ==
2,5-Bis(trimethylsilyl)-3,4-dimethyl-1-phenyl-1H-bismole, for example, can be formed by the reaction of (1Z,3Z)-1,4-bis(trimethylsilyl)-1,4-diiodobuta-2,3-dimethyl-1,3-diene and diiodophenylbismuthine. Bismoles can be used to form ferrocene-like sandwich compounds.

== See also ==
- Organobismuth chemistry
