= Ferrole =

Class of chemical compounds

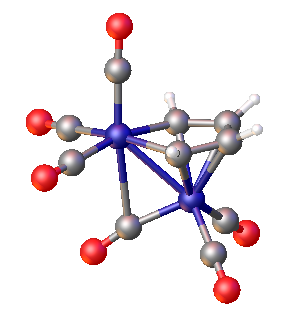
Structure of the ferrole Fe_{2}C_{4}H_{4}(CO)_{6}. Color scheme: red = O, gray = C, dark blue = Fe, white = H.

In organoiron chemistry, a ferrole is a type of diiron complex containing the (OC)_{3}FeC_{4}R_{4} heterocycle that is pi-bonded to a Fe(CO)_{3} group. These compounds have Fe-Fe bonds (ca. 252 pm) and semi-bridging CO ligands (Fe-C distances = 178, 251 pm). They are typically air-stable, soluble in nonpolar solvents, and red-orange in color.

== Synthesis ==
Ferroles typically arise by the reaction of alkynes with iron carbonyls. Such reactions are known to generate many products, e.g. complexes of cyclopentadienones and para-quinones.

Another route involves the desulfurization of thiophenes (SC_{4}R_{4}) by iron carbonyls, shown in the following idealized equation:

Fe_{3}(CO)_{12} + SC_{4}R_{4} → Fe_{2}(CO)_{6}C_{4}R_{4} + FeS + 6 CO

An unusual route to ferroles involves treatment of Collman's reagent with trimethylsilyl chloride (tms = (CH_{3})_{3}Si):

2 Na_{2}Fe(CO)_{4} + 4 tmsCl → Fe_{2}(CO)_{6}C_{4}(Otms)_{4} + 2 CO + 4 NaCl

== Reactions ==
Some ferroles react with tertiary phosphines to give the substituted flyover complex Fe_{2}(CO)_{5}(PR_{3})(C_{4}R_{4}CO).
