= Iron carbonyl =

There are three homoleptic iron carbonyl compounds:

- The monomeric iron pentacarbonyl
- The dimeric diiron nonacarbonyl
- The trimeric triiron dodecacarbonyl
