= Stannole =

Organotin compound

Skeletal formula of stannole
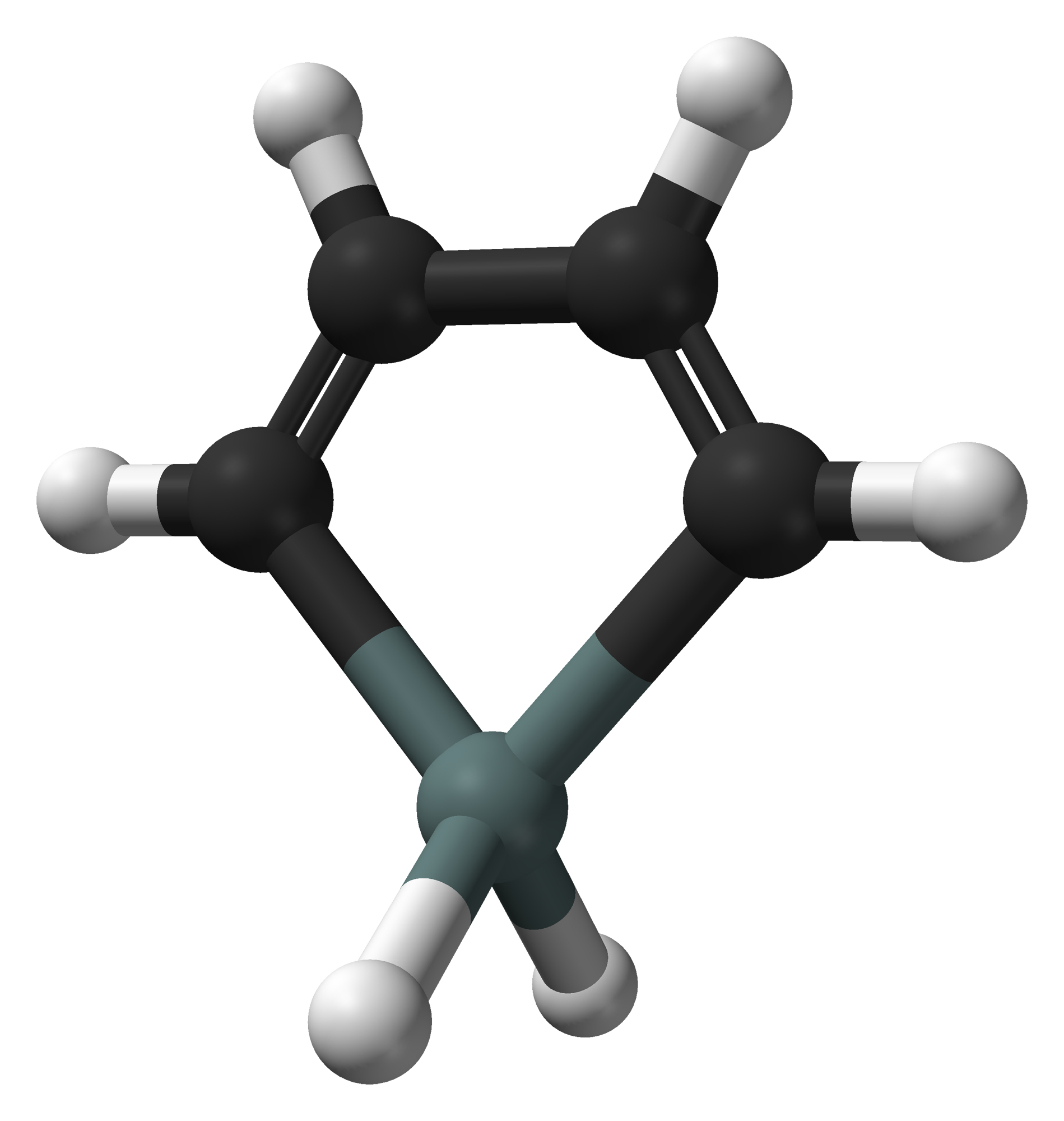

Names
- Preferred IUPAC name 1H-Stannole

Identifiers
CAS Number	288-07-3
3D model (JSmol)	Interactive image
ChemSpider	57535729
PubChem CID	71357546
CompTox Dashboard (EPA)	DTXSID70781612
- InChI: InChI=1S/C4H4.Sn.2H/c1-3-4-2;;;/h1-4H;;; Key: UCLKYZNUCJCVMQ-UHFFFAOYSA-N
- SMILES: [SnH2]1C=CC=C1

Properties
Chemical formula	C_{4}H_{6}Sn
Molar mass	172.802 g·mol^{−1}
- Except where otherwise noted, data are given for materials in their standard state (at 25 °C [77 °F], 100 kPa). Infobox references

Stannole is an organotin compound with the formula (CH)_{4}SnH_{2}. It is classified as a metallole, i.e. an unsaturated five-membered ring containing a heteroatom. It is a structural analog of cyclopentadiene, with tin replacing the saturated carbon atom. Substituted derivatives, which have been synthesized, are also called stannoles.

== Examples ==
1,1-Dibutylstannole is a pale yellow oil prepared from 1,4-dilithio-1,3-butadiene and dibutyltin dichloride.

1,1-Dimethyl-2,3,4,5-tetraphenyl-1H-stannole, for example, can be formed by the displacement reaction of 1,4-dilithio-1,2,3,4-tetraphenyl-1,3-butadiene and dimethyltin dichloride.

Palladium and cobalt catalyze a [2+2+1] cycloaddition between two acetylene molecules and a stannylene SnR_{2} to give the corresponding stannole.

== Related compounds ==
1λ^{2}-Stannole has formula C_{4}H_{4}Sn, with no hydrogen on the tin atom, which is in the +2 oxidation state.

== See also ==
- Organotin chemistry
