= C10H14O =

The molecular formula C_{10}H_{14}O (molar mass: 150.22 g/mol, exact mass: 150.104465 u) can refer to:

- o-sec-Butylphenol
- Carvacrol
- Carvone
- Chrysanthenone
- Cumyl alcohol
- 2-Ethyl-4,5-dimethylphenol, a phenolic compound found in rosemary essential oil
- Levoverbenone
- Menthofuran
- Penguinone
- Perillaldehyde
- Perillene
- Pinocarvone
- Rosefuran
- Safranal
- Thymol
- Umbellulone
- Verbenone
- 2-Methyl-1-phenyl-2-propanol
