= C28H22 =

The molecular formula C_{28}H_{22} (molar mass : 358.484 g/mol) may refer to:

- 1,1,4,4-Tetraphenylbutadiene
- 1,2,3,4-Tetraphenylbutadiene
