= C11H16O =

The molecular formula C_{11}H_{16}O may refer to:

- Jasmone
- Various aromatic alcohols with one benzene ring
- Various aromatic ethers such as benzyl tert-butyl ether
- Various aromatic alcohols or phenols such as pentamethylphenol.
