= C5H4O =

The molecular formula C_{5}H_{4}O (molar mass: 80.08 g/mol, exact mass: 80.0262 u) may refer to:

- Cyclopentadienone
- 1,4-Pentadiyn-3-ol
- 2,4-Pentadiyn-1-ol
