= Aromatic alcohol =

In organic chemistry, the aromatic alcohols or aryl-alcohols are a class of chemical compounds containing a hydroxyl group (−OH) bonded indirectly to an aromatic hydrocarbon group, in contrast to the phenols, where the hydroxyl group is bonded directly to an aromatic carbon atom.

Aromatic alcohols are produced by the yeast Candida albicans. They are also found in beer. These molecules are quorum sensing compounds for Saccharomyces cerevisiae.

== Metabolism ==
Aryl-alcohol dehydrogenase uses an aromatic alcohol and NAD^{+} to produce an aromatic aldehyde, NADH and H^{+}.

Aryl-alcohol dehydrogenase (NADP+) uses an aromatic alcohol and NADP^{+} to produce an aromatic aldehyde, NADPH and H^{+}.

Aryldialkylphosphatase (also known as organophosphorus hydrolase, phosphotriesterase, and paraoxon hydrolase) uses an aryl dialkyl phosphate and H_{2}O to produce dialkyl phosphate and an aryl alcohol.

== Examples ==
- 1P2P
- Benzyl alcohol
- DMBC
- Tryptophol
- Tyrosol
- Phenethyl alcohol (Phenylethanol)

== See also ==
- Phenolic acid
- Aromatic acid
