= Diphenylacetylene =

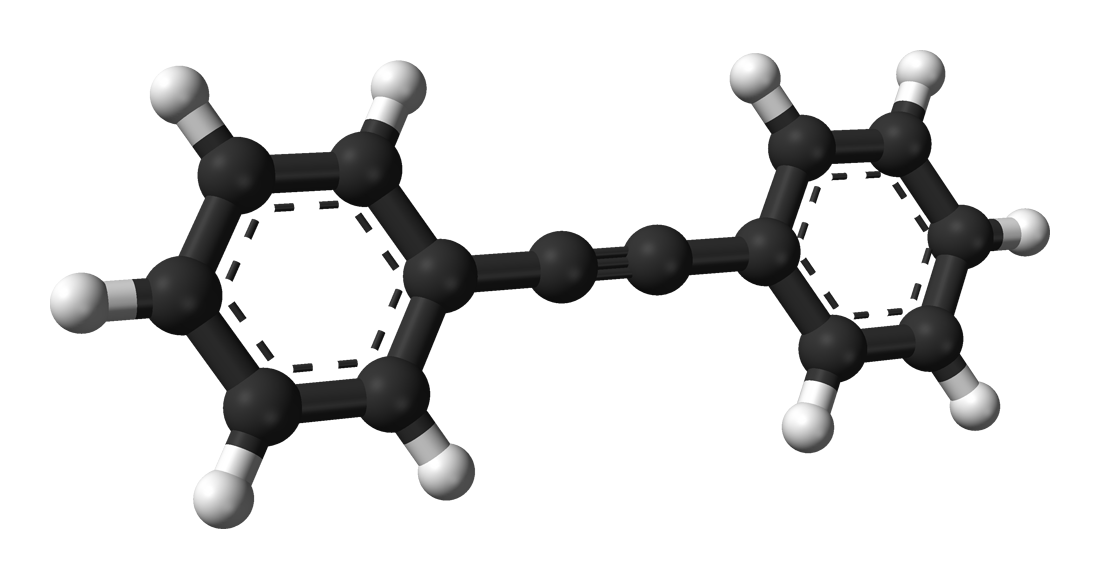

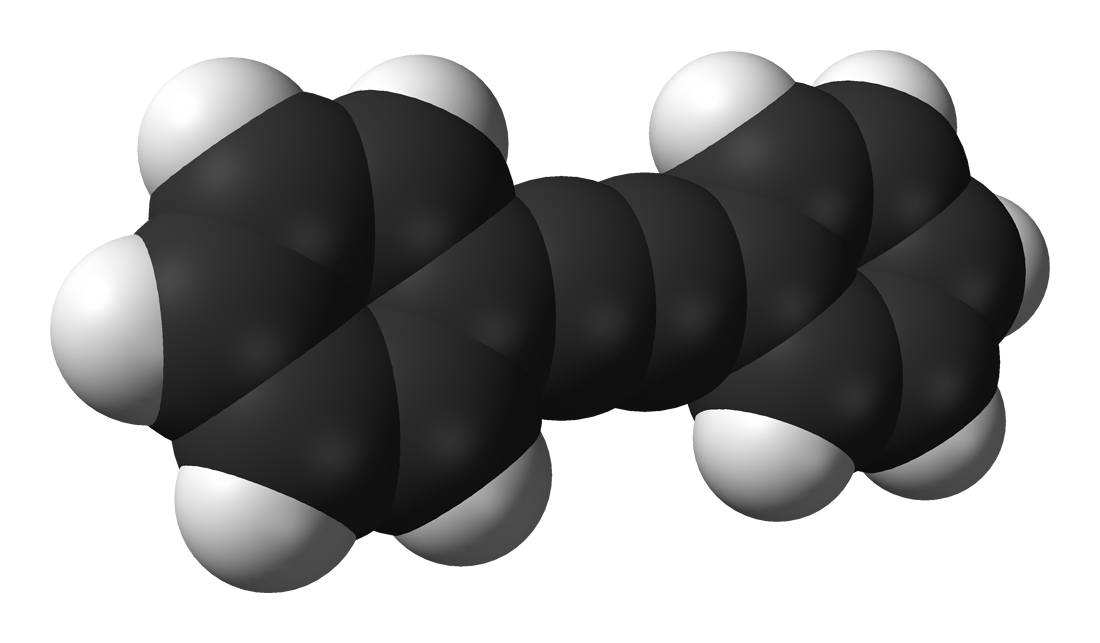

Names
- Preferred IUPAC name 1,1′-Ethynediyldibenzene
- Other names Tolane; 1,2-Diphenylethyne; Diphenylethyne; 2-Phenylethynylbenzene; Tolan

Identifiers
CAS Number	501-65-5
3D model (JSmol)	Interactive image
Beilstein Reference	606478
ChEBI	CHEBI:51579
ChEMBL	ChEMBL223309
ChemSpider	9961
ECHA InfoCard	100.007.206
EC Number	207-926-6
PubChem CID	10390
UNII	Y70JA8HB75
CompTox Dashboard (EPA)	DTXSID4060109
- InChI: InChI=1S/C14H10/c1-3-7-13(8-4-1)11-12-14-9-5-2-6-10-14/h1-10H Key: JRXXLCKWQFKACW-UHFFFAOYSA-N; InChI=1/C14H10/c1-3-7-13(8-4-1)11-12-14-9-5-2-6-10-14/h1-10H Key: JRXXLCKWQFKACW-UHFFFAOYAN
- SMILES: c1ccc(cc1)C#Cc2ccccc2

Properties
Chemical formula	C_{14}H_{10}
Molar mass	178.234 g·mol^{−1}
Appearance	Colorless solid
Density	1.136 g cm^{−3}
Melting point	62.5 °C (144.5 °F; 335.6 K)
Boiling point	170 °C (338 °F; 443 K) at 19 mmHg
Solubility in water	Insoluble

Structure
Dipole moment	0 D

Hazards
Safety data sheet (SDS)	Fisher Scientific MSDS

Related compounds
Related compounds	But-2-yne; Dimethyl acetylenedicarboxylate
- Except where otherwise noted, data are given for materials in their standard state (at 25 °C [77 °F], 100 kPa). verify (what is ?) Infobox references

Diphenylacetylene is the chemical compound C_{6}H_{5}C≡CC_{6}H_{5}. The molecule consists of two phenyl groups attached to a C_{2} unit. A colorless solid, it is used as a building block in organic synthesis and as a ligand in organometallic chemistry.

== Preparation and structure ==
In one preparation for this compound, benzil is condensed with hydrazine to give the bis(hydrazone), which is oxidized with mercury(II) oxide. Alternatively stilbene is brominated, and the resulting dibromodiphenylethane is subjected to dehydrohalogenation. Yet another method involves the coupling of iodobenzene and the copper salt of phenylacetylene in the Castro-Stephens coupling. The related Sonogashira coupling involves the coupling of iodobenzene and phenylacetylene.

Diphenylacetylene is a planar molecule. The central C≡C distance is 119.8 picometers.

== Derivatives ==
1,2,3,4-Tetraphenylbutadiene is prepared by reductive coupling of diphenylacetylene using lithium metal followed by hydrolysis of the resulting 1,4-dilithiobutadiene:

2 PhC≡CPh + 2 Li → LiCPh=CPh−CPh=CPhLi (Ph = C_{6}H_{5})
LiCPh=CPh−CPh=CPhLi + 2 H_{2}O → PhCH=CPh−CPh=CHPh + 2 LiOH

Reaction of diphenylacetylene with tetraphenylcyclopentadienone results in the formation of hexaphenylbenzene in a Diels–Alder reaction.

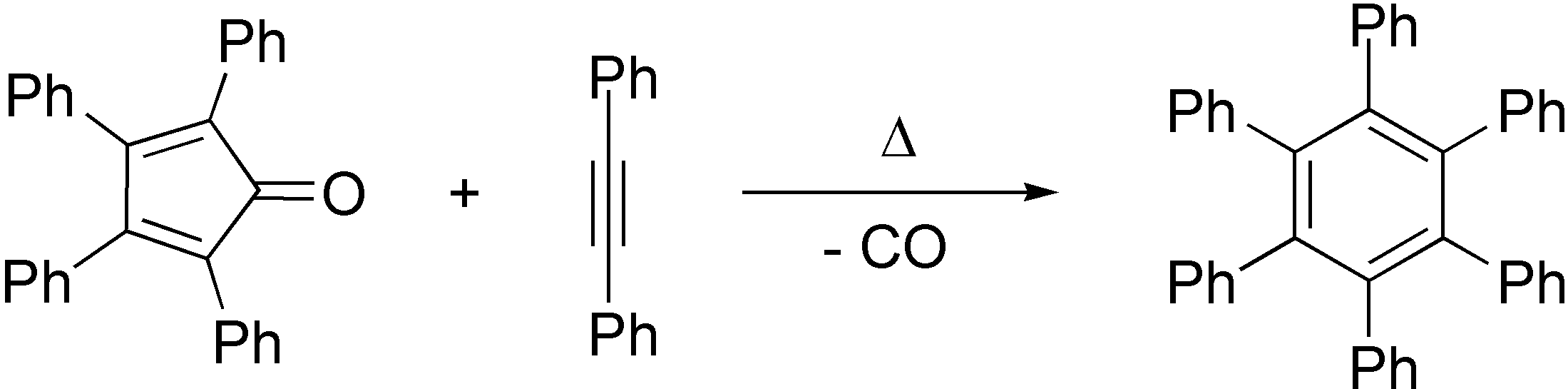

Dicobalt octacarbonyl catalyzes alkyne trimerisation of diphenylacetylene to form hexaphenylbenzene.

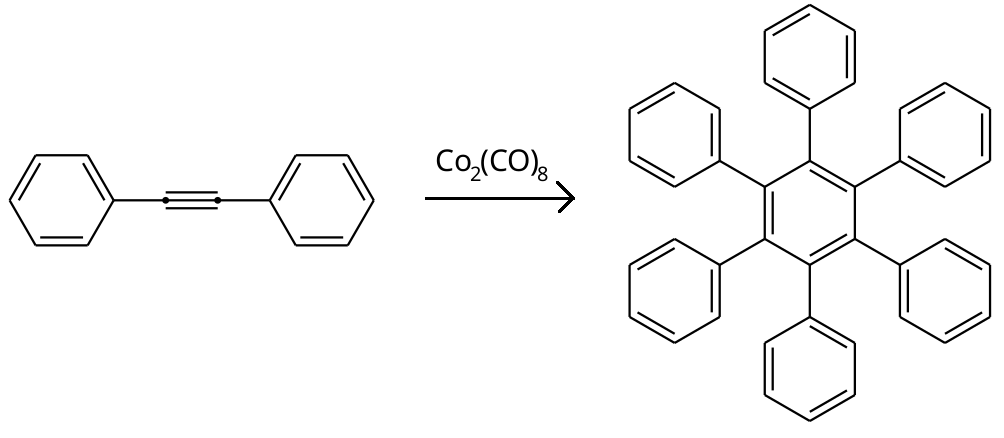

Reaction of Ph_{2}C_{2} with benzal chloride in the presence of potassium t-butoxide affords 3-tert-butoxy-1,2,3-triphenylcyclopropene, which converts to 1,2,3-triphenylcyclopropenium bromide after the elimination of tert-butoxide.
