= Tetraphenylcyclopentadienone =

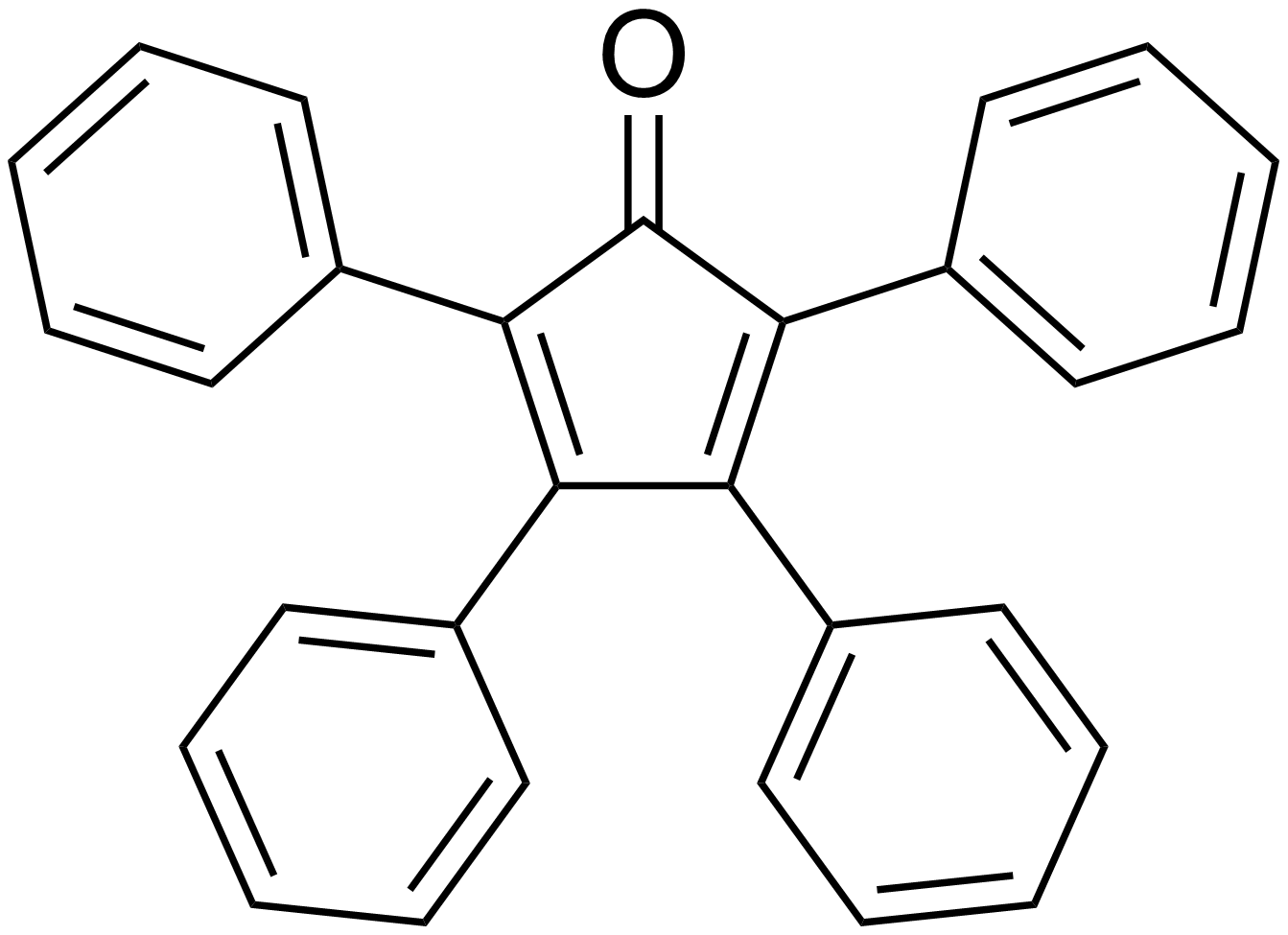

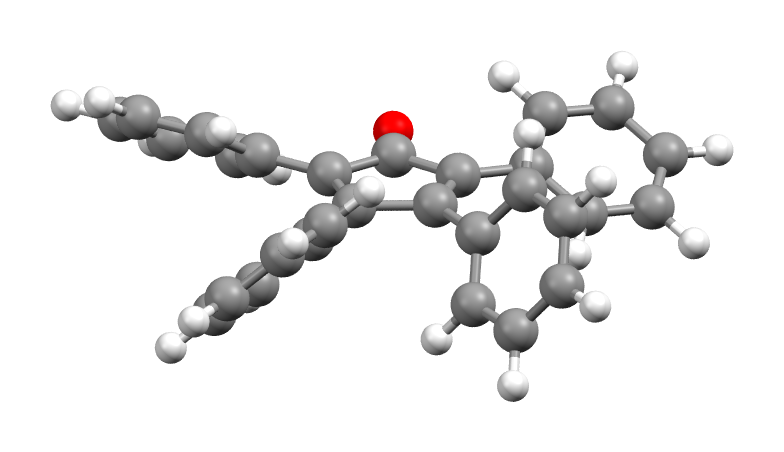
- Perspective view, showing the canted phenyl rings

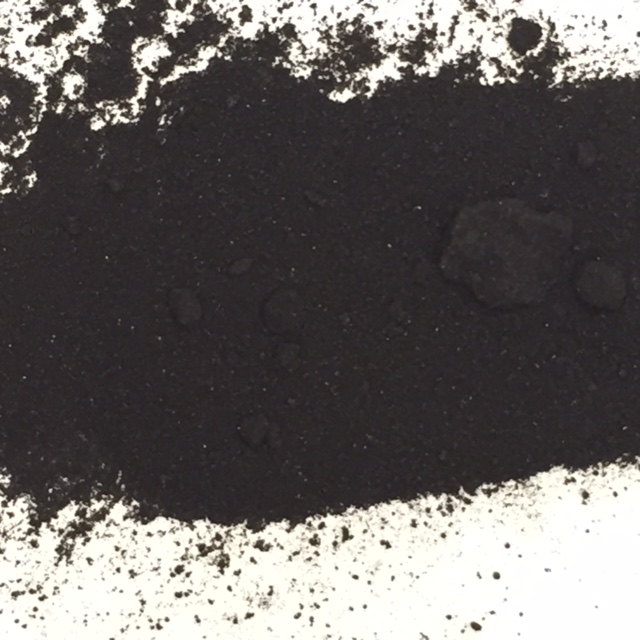

Names
- Preferred IUPAC name 2,3,4,5-Tetraphenylcyclopenta-2,4-dien-1-one
- Other names Tetracyclone, TPCPD, Cyclone

Identifiers
CAS Number	479-33-4
3D model (JSmol)	Interactive image
ChemSpider	61382
ECHA InfoCard	100.006.847
PubChem CID	68068
UNII	E8CT23P8WP
CompTox Dashboard (EPA)	DTXSID1060059
- InChI: InChI=1S/C29H20O/c30-29-27(23-17-9-3-10-18-23)25(21-13-5-1-6-14-21)26(22-15-7-2-8-16-22)28(29)24-19-11-4-12-20-24/h1-20H Key: PLGPSDNOLCVGSS-UHFFFAOYSA-N; InChI=1/C29H20O/c30-29-27(23-17-9-3-10-18-23)25(21-13-5-1-6-14-21)26(22-15-7-2-8-16-22)28(29)24-19-11-4-12-20-24/h1-20H Key: PLGPSDNOLCVGSS-UHFFFAOYAO
- SMILES: O=C2C(=C(/C(=C2/c1ccccc1)c3ccccc3)c4ccccc4)\c5ccccc5

Properties
Chemical formula	C_{29}H_{20}O
Molar mass	384.478 g·mol^{−1}
Appearance	black solid
Melting point	219 to 220 °C (426 to 428 °F; 492 to 493 K)
- Except where otherwise noted, data are given for materials in their standard state (at 25 °C [77 °F], 100 kPa). verify (what is ?) Infobox references

Tetraphenylcyclopentadienone is an organic compound with the formula (C_{6}H_{5}C)_{4}C_{4}C=O. It is classified as a cyclic dienone. It is a dark purple to black crystalline solid that is soluble in organic solvents. It is an easily made building block for many organic and organometallic compounds. It can be synthesized by a double aldol condensation involving benzil and dibenzyl ketone.

== Structure ==
The C_{5}O core of the molecule is planar and conjugated, but the bonds have a definite alternating single- and double-bond nature. The C2–C3 and C4–C5 distances are 1.35 Å, while the C1–C2, C3–C4, C5–C1 are closer to single bonds with distances near 1.50 Å. The phenyl groups of tetraphenylcyclopentadienone adopt a "propeller" shape in its 3D conformation. The four phenyl rings are rotated out of the plane of the central ring because of steric repulsion with each other.

Unlike the parent compound cyclopentadienone, which rapidly dimerizes, the tetraphenyl derivative is isolable at room temperature.

== Synthesis ==
Tetraphenylcyclopentadienone can be synthesized by a double aldol condensation involving benzil and dibenzyl ketone in the presence of a basic catalyst.

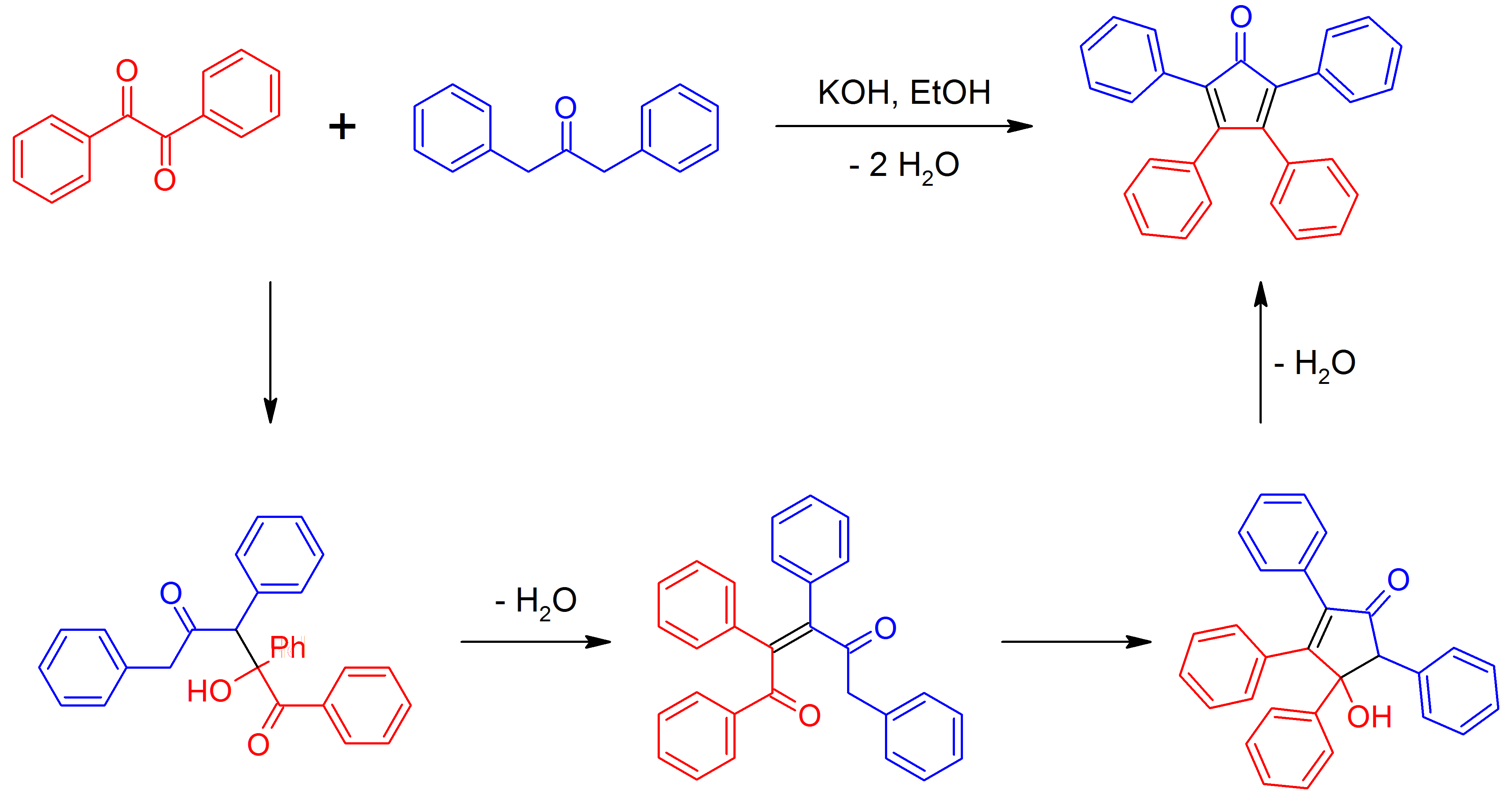

== Reactions ==
The central ring can serve as a diene in Diels–Alder reactions with various dienophiles. For example, reaction with benzyne leads to 1,2,3,4-tetraphenylnaphthalene and reaction with diphenylacetylene leads to hexaphenylbenzene. In this way, it is a precursor to graphene-like molecules, such as coronene.

Similarly, pentaphenylpyridine derivatives may be prepared via a Diels–Alder reaction between tetraphenylcyclopentadienone and benzonitrile.

Tetraphenylcyclopentadienone can provide an effective alternative to DDQ in aromatization of porphyrins:

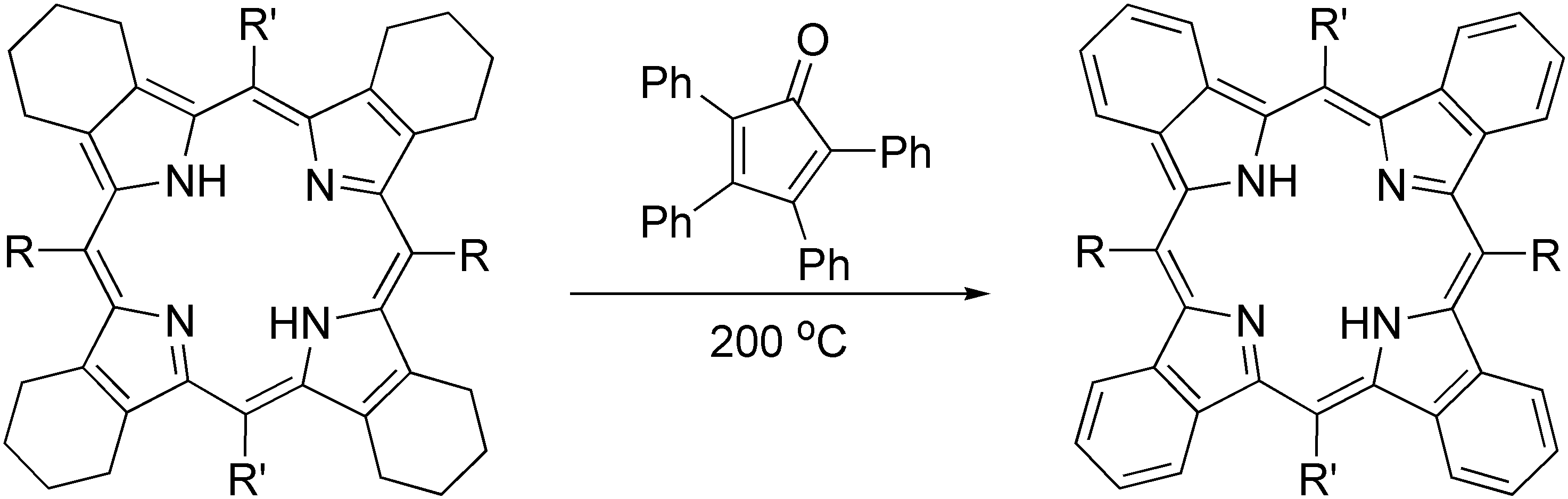

=== Ligand in organometallic chemistry ===
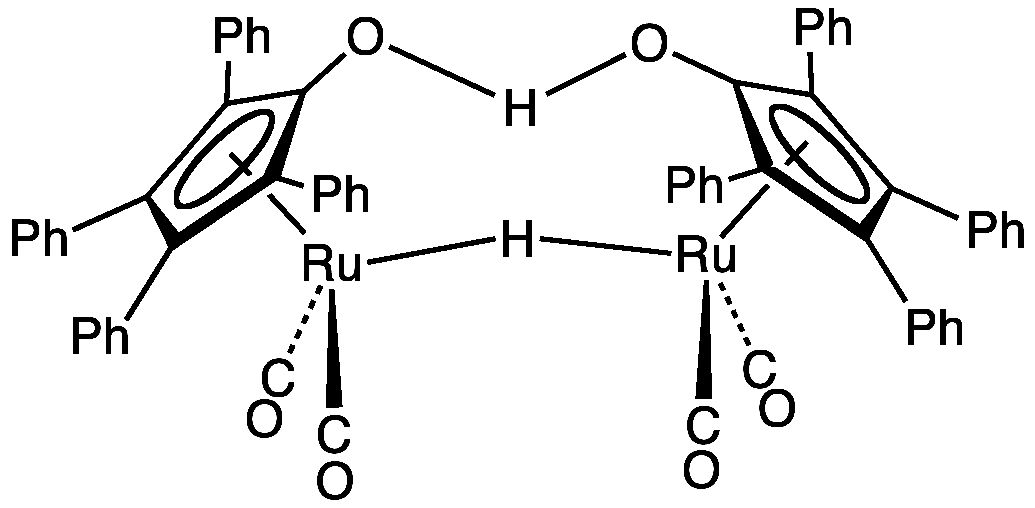
The Shvo catalyst is a ruthenium complex of tetraphenylcyclopentadienone

Tetraarylcyclopentadienones are a well studied class of ligands in organometallic chemistry. The Shvo catalyst, useful for certain hydrogenations, is derived from tetraphenylcyclopentadienone.
