= Aryl-alcohol dehydrogenase =

Class of enzymes

aryl-alcohol dehydrogenase

Identifiers
- EC no.: 1.1.1.90
- CAS no.: 37250-26-3

Databases
- IntEnz: IntEnz view
- BRENDA: BRENDA entry
- ExPASy: NiceZyme view
- KEGG: KEGG entry
- MetaCyc: metabolic pathway
- PRIAM: profile
- PDB structures: RCSB PDB PDBe PDBsum
- Gene Ontology: AmiGO / QuickGO
Search
- PMC: articles
- PubMed: articles
- NCBI: proteins

In enzymology, an aryl-alcohol dehydrogenase (EC 1.1.1.90) is an enzyme that catalyzes the chemical reaction

an aromatic alcohol + NAD^{+} $\rightleftharpoons$ an aromatic aldehyde + NADH + H^{+}

The two substrates of this enzyme are an aromatic alcohol and oxidised nicotinamide adenine dinucleotide (NAD^{+}). Its products are the corresponding aromatic aldehyde, reduced NADH, and a proton.

This enzyme belongs to the family of oxidoreductases, specifically those acting on the CH-OH group of donor with NAD^{+} or NADP^{+} as acceptor. The systematic name of this enzyme class is aryl-alcohol:NAD^{+} oxidoreductase. Other names in common use include p-hydroxybenzyl alcohol dehydrogenase, benzyl alcohol dehydrogenase, and coniferyl alcohol dehydrogenase. This enzyme participates in 5 metabolic pathways: tyrosine metabolism, phenylalanine metabolism, biphenyl degradation, toluene and xylene degradation, and caprolactam degradation.

== Structural studies ==
As of late 2007, only one structure has been solved for this class of enzymes, with the PDB accession code 1F8F.
