= Hydroxybenzoic acid =

Hydroxybenzoic acid may refer to several related chemical compounds:

- 2-Hydroxybenzoic acid (salicylic acid, o-hydroxybenzoic acid)
- 3-Hydroxybenzoic acid (m-hydroxybenzoic acid)
- 4-Hydroxybenzoic acid (p-hydroxybenzoic acid)

== See also ==
- Dihydroxybenzoic acids
- Trihydroxybenzoic acids
- Phenolic acid
