= Dienone =

Dibenzylideneacetone is a well known dienone

A dienone is a class of organic compounds with the general formula (R_{2}C=CR)_{2}C=O, where R is any substituent, but often H. They are formally "derived from 1,4-diene compounds by conversion of a –CH2– group into –C(=O)– group", resulting in "a conjugated structure". They are a kind of enone. The class includes some heterocyclic compounds.

== Properties and occurrence ==
The parent member is divinyl ketone. It is a colorless liquid (b.p. 38-40 °C) that tends to polymerize upon standing.

Dienones can arise via tautomerism of resorcinols and some hydroxypyridines.

Being multifunctional, dienones engage in many reactions. They are often good dienophiles. They function as ligands, forming metal-alkene complexes such as tris(dibenzylideneacetone)dipalladium(0).

== Cyclic dienones ==
Extensive work has been reported on cyclic dienones. The parent of the seven-membered ring series is tropone. It is a not only a dienone but a trieneone.

Cyclohexadienones are a significant class of dienones, the premier members being the ortho- and para-quinones. Many cyclohexadienones convert to phenols. In the dienone–phenol rearrangement, they convert to phenols:

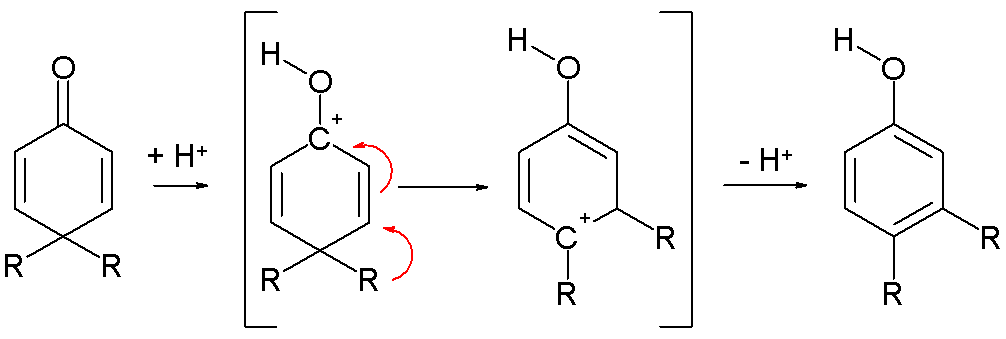
The dienone phenol rearrangement

The parent cyclopentadienone has only a fleeting existence under laboratory conditions, otherwise it dimerizes. The substituted derivative tetraphenylcyclopentadienone is however robust solid.

== See also ==
- Dione
- Penguinone
