= Phenolic acid =

Class of chemical compounds

Chemical structure of salicylic acid, a common phenolic acid

Phenolic acids or phenolcarboxylic acids are phenolic compounds and types of aromatic acid compounds. Included in that class are substances containing a phenolic ring and an organic carboxylic acid functional group. Two important naturally occurring types of phenolic acids are hydroxybenzoic acids and hydroxycinnamic acids, which are derived from non-phenolic molecules of benzoic and cinnamic acid, respectively.

== Occurrences ==
Phenolic acids can be found in many plant species. Their content in dried fruits can be high.

Natural phenols in horse grams (Macrotyloma uniflorum) are mostly phenolic acids, namely protocatechuic, p-hydroxy benzoic, vanillic, caffeic, p-coumaric, ferulic, syringic, and sinapinic acids.

Phenolic acids can be found in several mushroom-forming species of basidiomycetes. It is also a part of the humic substances, which are the major organic constituents of soil humus.

Many phenolic acids can be found in human urine.

== Chemistry ==
Immobilized Candida antarctica lipase can be used to catalyze the direct acetylation of flavonoids with phenolic acids.

== See also ==
- Benzoic acid
- Aromatic alcohol
- List of phytochemicals in food
