= Pinocarvone =

Names
- IUPAC name 6,6-dimethyl-2-methylidenebicyclo[3.1.1]heptan-3-one

Identifiers
CAS Number	30460-92-5
3D model (JSmol)	Interactive image
ChEBI	CHEBI:28996
ChemSpider	108603
ECHA InfoCard	100.045.632
EC Number	250-211-9
KEGG	C09884
PubChem CID	121719
CompTox Dashboard (EPA)	DTXSID90865544
- InChI: InChI=1S/C10H14O/c1-6-8-4-7(5-9(6)11)10(8,2)3/h7-8H,1,4-5H2,2-3H3 Key: TZDMGBLPGZXHJI-UHFFFAOYSA-N
- SMILES: CC1(C2CC1C(=C)C(=O)C2)C

Properties
Chemical formula	C_{10}H_{14}O
Molar mass	150.22 g·mol^{−1}

Hazards
- GHS labelling
Pictograms	(GHS05: Corrosive) (GHS07: Exclamation mark) (GHS08: Health hazard)
Signal word	Danger
Hazard statements	H315, H317, H318, H341
Precautionary statements	P203, P261, P264, P264+P265, P272, P280, P302+P352, P305+P354+P338, P317, P318, P321, P333+P317, P362+P364, P405, P501
- Except where otherwise noted, data are given for materials in their standard state (at 25 °C [77 °F], 100 kPa). Infobox references

Pinocarvone is a terpenoid. Structurally, it is a bicyclic ketone.

== Occurrence ==
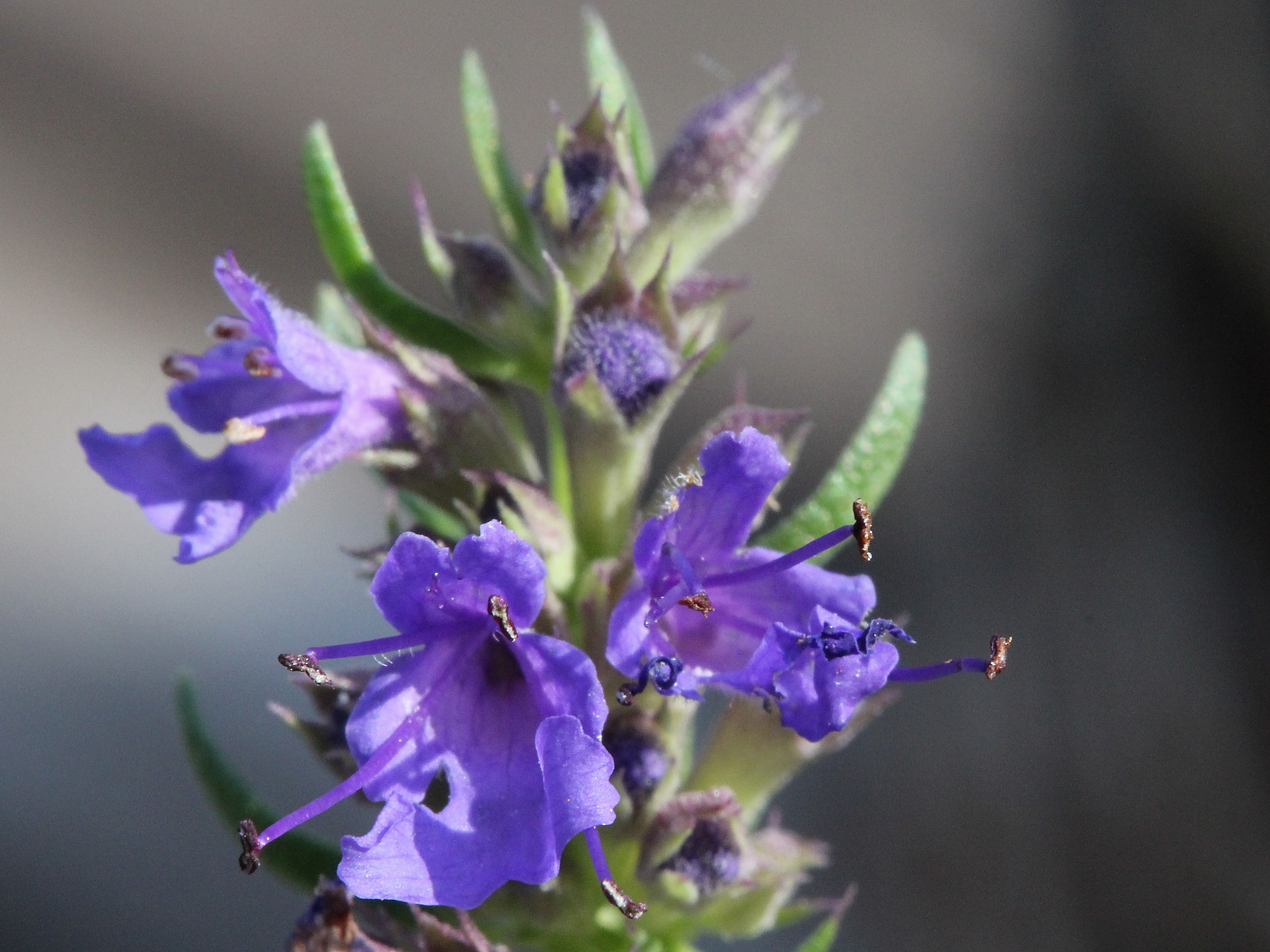
hyssop plant

Pinocarvone is an important component in the essential oils of Eucalyptus globulus. It is also found at a few percent in essential oils of other eucalyptus species. In several studies, it has been detected as a component of 25% or even 36% in hyssop oil.

Pinocarvone is also present in the pheromone of the Western Pine Beetle (Dendroctonus brevicomis) along with frontalin, verbenone, and myrtenol.

== Properties and reactions ==
Under the influence of light or heat, pinocarvone polymerizes by reaction of its double bond to form a resin. Polymerization can also be carried out deliberately, for example by heating the compound in anisole.
