= 1,2,3,4-Tetraphenylnaphthalene =

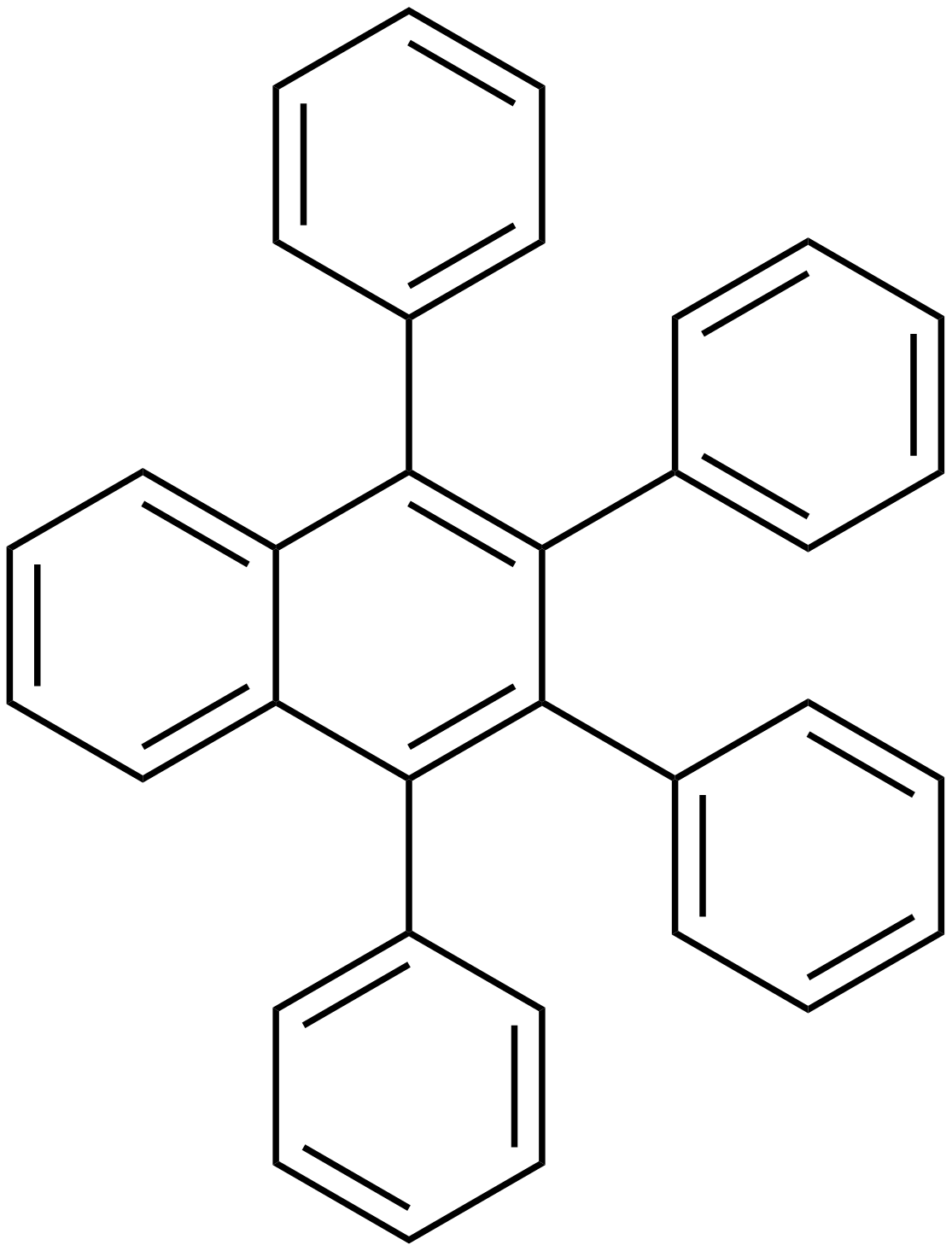

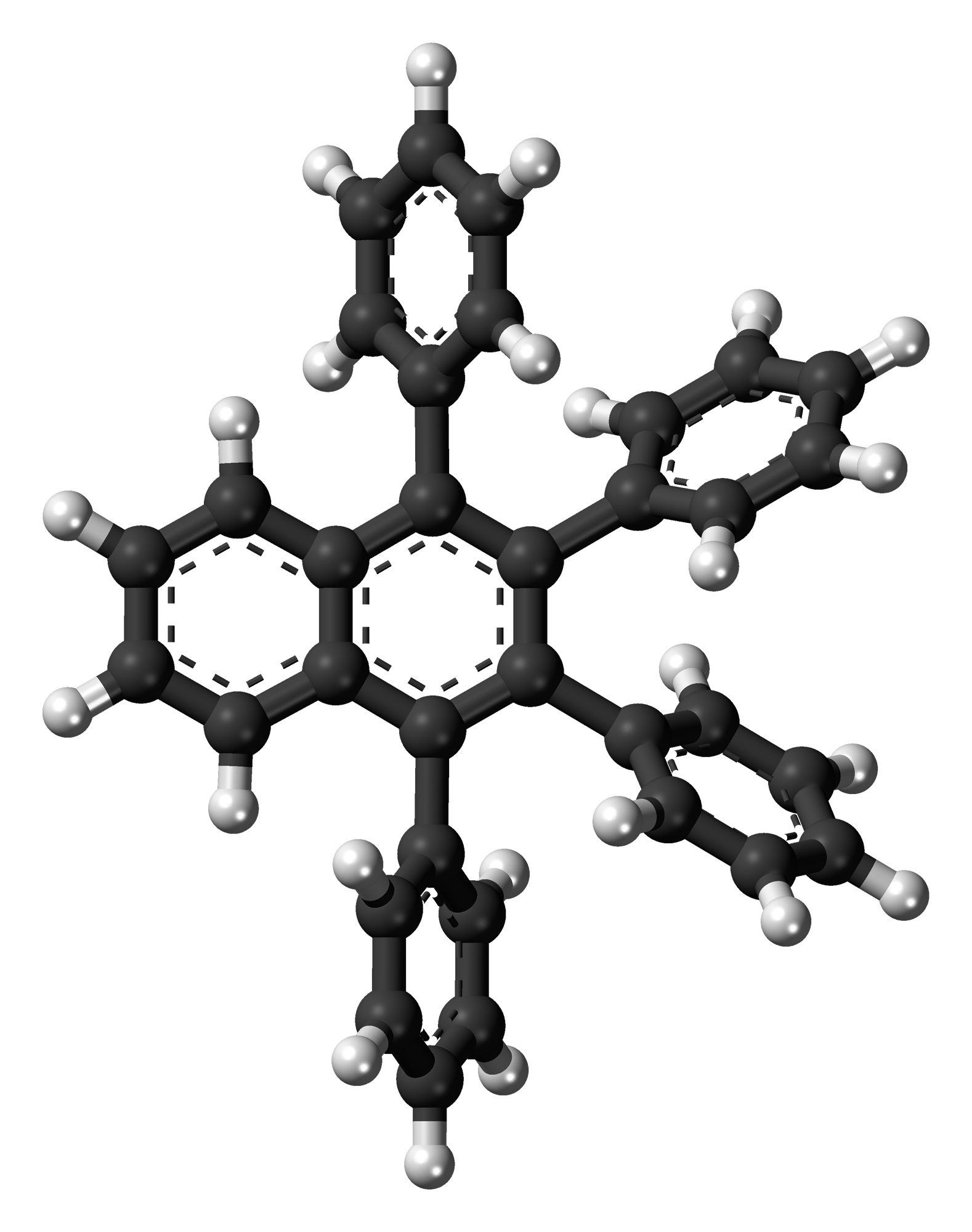

Names
- Preferred IUPAC name 1,2,3,4-Tetraphenylnaphthalene

Identifiers
CAS Number	751-38-2
3D model (JSmol)	Interactive image; Interactive image
ChemSpider	62982
ECHA InfoCard	100.151.838
EC Number	623-131-0
PubChem CID	69783
UNII	AQ533SQ362
CompTox Dashboard (EPA)	DTXSID90226070
- InChI: InChI=1S/C34H24/c1-5-15-25(16-6-1)31-29-23-13-14-24-30(29)32(26-17-7-2-8-18-26)34(28-21-11-4-12-22-28)33(31)27-19-9-3-10-20-27/h1-24H Key: UCTTYTFENYGAPP-UHFFFAOYSA-N; InChI=1/C34H24/c1-5-15-25(16-6-1)31-29-23-13-14-24-30(29)32(26-17-7-2-8-18-26)34(28-21-11-4-12-22-28)33(31)27-19-9-3-10-20-27/h1-24H Key: UCTTYTFENYGAPP-UHFFFAOYAS
- SMILES: C1=CC=C(C=C1)C2=C(C(=C(C3=CC=CC=C32)C4=CC=CC=C4)C5=CC=CC=C5)C6=CC=CC=C6; c15ccccc1c(c2ccccc2)c(c3ccccc3)c(c4ccccc4)c5c6ccccc6

Properties
Chemical formula	C_{34}H_{24}
Molar mass	432.55 g/mol
Melting point	199 to 201 °C (390 to 394 °F; 472 to 474 K)

Hazards
- GHS labelling
Pictograms	(GHS07: Exclamation mark)
Signal word	Warning
Hazard statements	H315, H319, H335
Precautionary statements	P261, P264, P271, P280, P302+P352, P304+P340, P305+P351+P338, P312, P321, P332+P313, P337+P313, P362, P403+P233, P405, P501
- Except where otherwise noted, data are given for materials in their standard state (at 25 °C [77 °F], 100 kPa). verify (what is ?) Infobox references

1,2,3,4-Tetraphenylnaphthalene is a polycyclic aromatic hydrocarbon commonly prepared in the undergraduate teaching laboratory as an introduction to the Diels-Alder reaction, in this case between benzyne, which acts as the dienophile, (generated in situ) and tetraphenylcyclopentadienone, which acts as the diene. It has two crystalline forms, and therefore has two different melting points.
