= Hexaphenylbenzene =

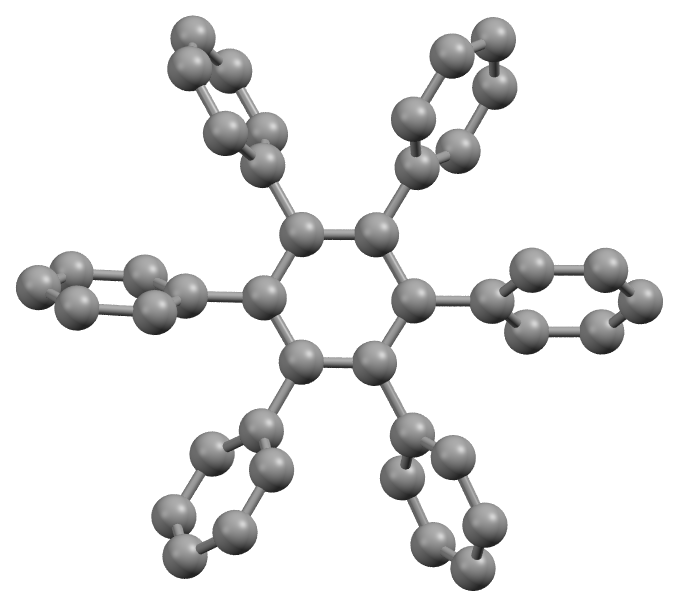

Names
- Preferred IUPAC name 2^{3},2^{4},2^{5},2^{6}-Tetraphenyl-1^{1},2^{1}:2^{2},3^{1}-terphenyl
- Other names Hexaphenylbenzene

Identifiers
CAS Number	992-04-1
3D model (JSmol)	Interactive image
ChemSpider	63611
ECHA InfoCard	100.012.356
PubChem CID	70432
UNII	35L5JAJ94N
CompTox Dashboard (EPA)	DTXSID30243983
- InChI: InChI=1S/C42H30/c1-7-19-31(20-8-1)37-38(32-21-9-2-10-22-32)40(34-25-13-4-14-26-34)42(36-29-17-6-18-30-36)41(35-27-15-5-16-28-35)39(37)33-23-11-3-12-24-33/h1-30H Key: QBHWPVJPWQGYDS-UHFFFAOYSA-N; InChI=1/C42H30/c1-7-19-31(20-8-1)37-38(32-21-9-2-10-22-32)40(34-25-13-4-14-26-34)42(36-29-17-6-18-30-36)41(35-27-15-5-16-28-35)39(37)33-23-11-3-12-24-33/h1-30H Key: QBHWPVJPWQGYDS-UHFFFAOYAG
- SMILES: c1cc(ccc1)c3c(c(c(c(c3c2ccccc2)c4ccccc4)c5ccccc5)c6ccccc6)c7ccccc7

Properties
Chemical formula	C_{42}H_{30}
Molar mass	534.702 g·mol^{−1}
Appearance	white solid
Melting point	454 to 456 °C (849 to 853 °F; 727 to 729 K)
- Except where otherwise noted, data are given for materials in their standard state (at 25 °C [77 °F], 100 kPa). verify (what is ?) Infobox references

Hexaphenylbenzene is an aromatic compound composed of a benzene ring substituted with six phenyl rings. It is a colorless solid. The compound is the parent member of a wider class of hexaarylbenzenes, which are mainly of theoretical interest.

== Preparation ==
It is prepared by heating tetraphenylcyclopentadienone and diphenylacetylene in benzophenone or other high-temperature solvent. The reaction proceeds via a Diels–Alder reaction to give the hexaphenyldienone, which then eliminates carbon monoxide.

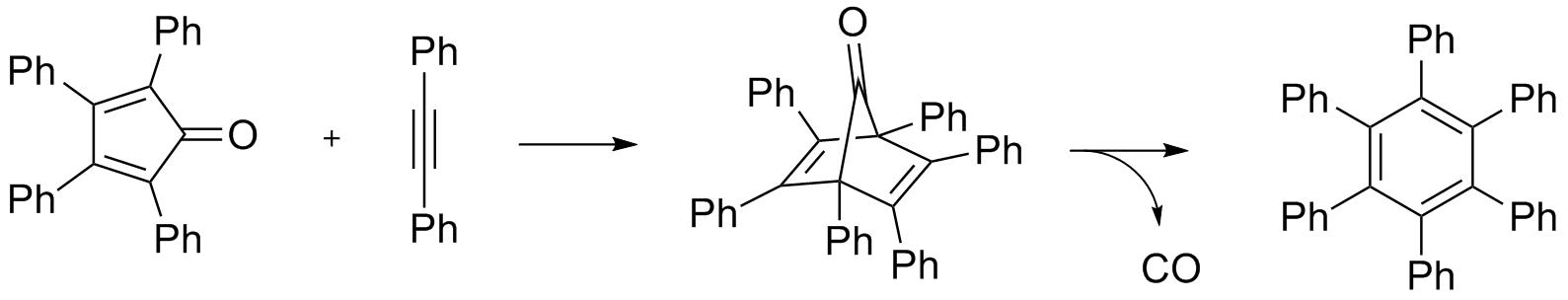

Together with 1,2,3,4-tetraphenylnaphthalene, hexaphenylbenzene forms by the chromium-catalyzed oligomerization of diphenylacetylene. It may also be prepared by the dicobalt octacarbonyl-catalyzed alkyne trimerisation of diphenylacetylene.

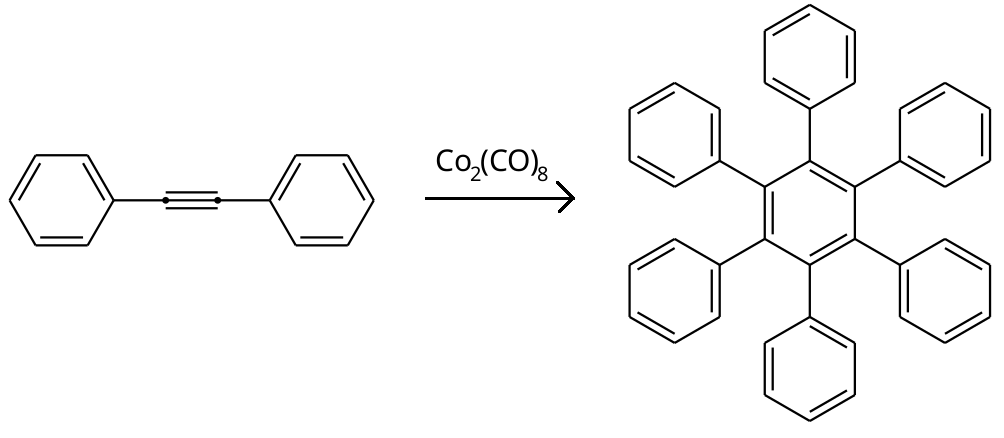

== Structure ==
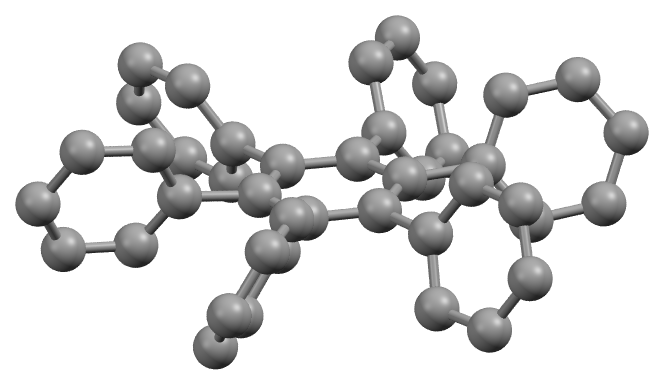
Perspective view of the crystal structure of hexaphenylbenzene, showing the rotation of the phenyl rings. Hydrogen atoms have been omitted for clarity.

The stable conformation of this molecule has the phenyl rings rotated out of the plane of the central benzene ring. The molecule adopts a propeller-like conformation in which the phenyl rings are rotated about 65°, while in the gas phase, they are perpendicular with some slight oscillations.
