= Aryl-alcohol dehydrogenase (NADP+) =

Class of enzymes

aryl-alcohol dehydrogenase (NADP^{+})

Identifiers
- EC no.: 1.1.1.91
- CAS no.: 37250-27-4

Databases
- IntEnz: IntEnz view
- BRENDA: BRENDA entry
- ExPASy: NiceZyme view
- KEGG: KEGG entry
- MetaCyc: metabolic pathway
- PRIAM: profile
- PDB structures: RCSB PDB PDBe PDBsum
- Gene Ontology: AmiGO / QuickGO
Search
- PMC: articles
- PubMed: articles
- NCBI: proteins

In enzymology, an aryl-alcohol dehydrogenase (NADP^{+}) (EC 1.1.1.91) is an enzyme that catalyzes the chemical reaction

an aromatic alcohol + NADP^{+} $\rightleftharpoons$ an aromatic aldehyde + NADPH + H^{+}

The two substrates of this enzyme are an aromatic alcohol and oxidised nicotinamide adenine dinucleotide phosphate (NADP^{+}). Its products are the corresponding aromatic aldehyde, reduced NADPH, and a proton.

This enzyme belongs to the family of oxidoreductases, specifically those acting on the CH-OH group of donor with NAD^{+} or NADP^{+} as acceptor. The systematic name of this enzyme class is aryl-alcohol:NADP^{+} oxidoreductase. Other names in common use include aryl alcohol dehydrogenase (nicotinamide adenine dinucleotide, phosphate), coniferyl alcohol dehydrogenase, NADPH-linked benzaldehyde reductase, and aryl-alcohol dehydrogenase (NADP^{+}).
