= Benzil =

- Benzil

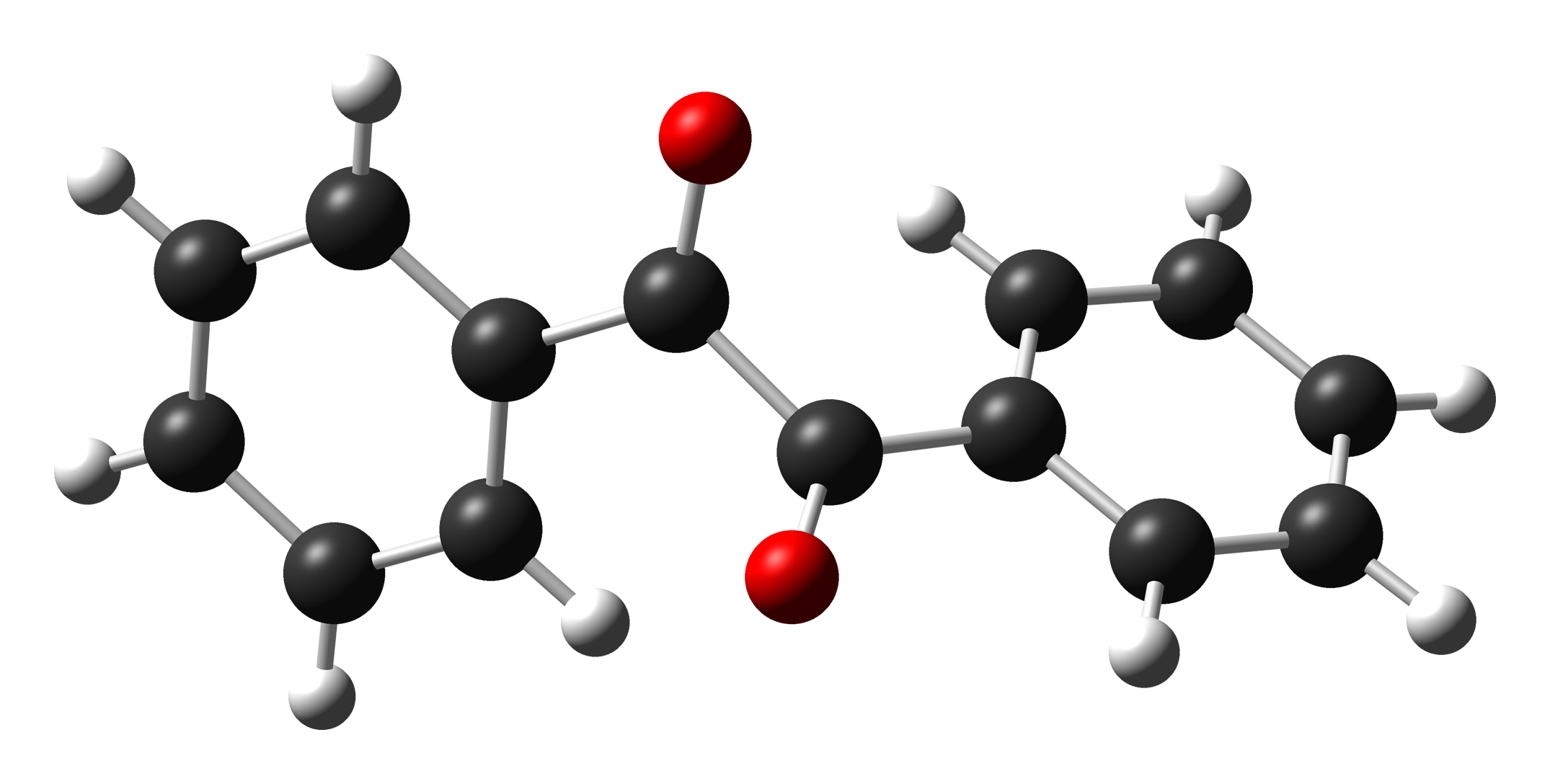

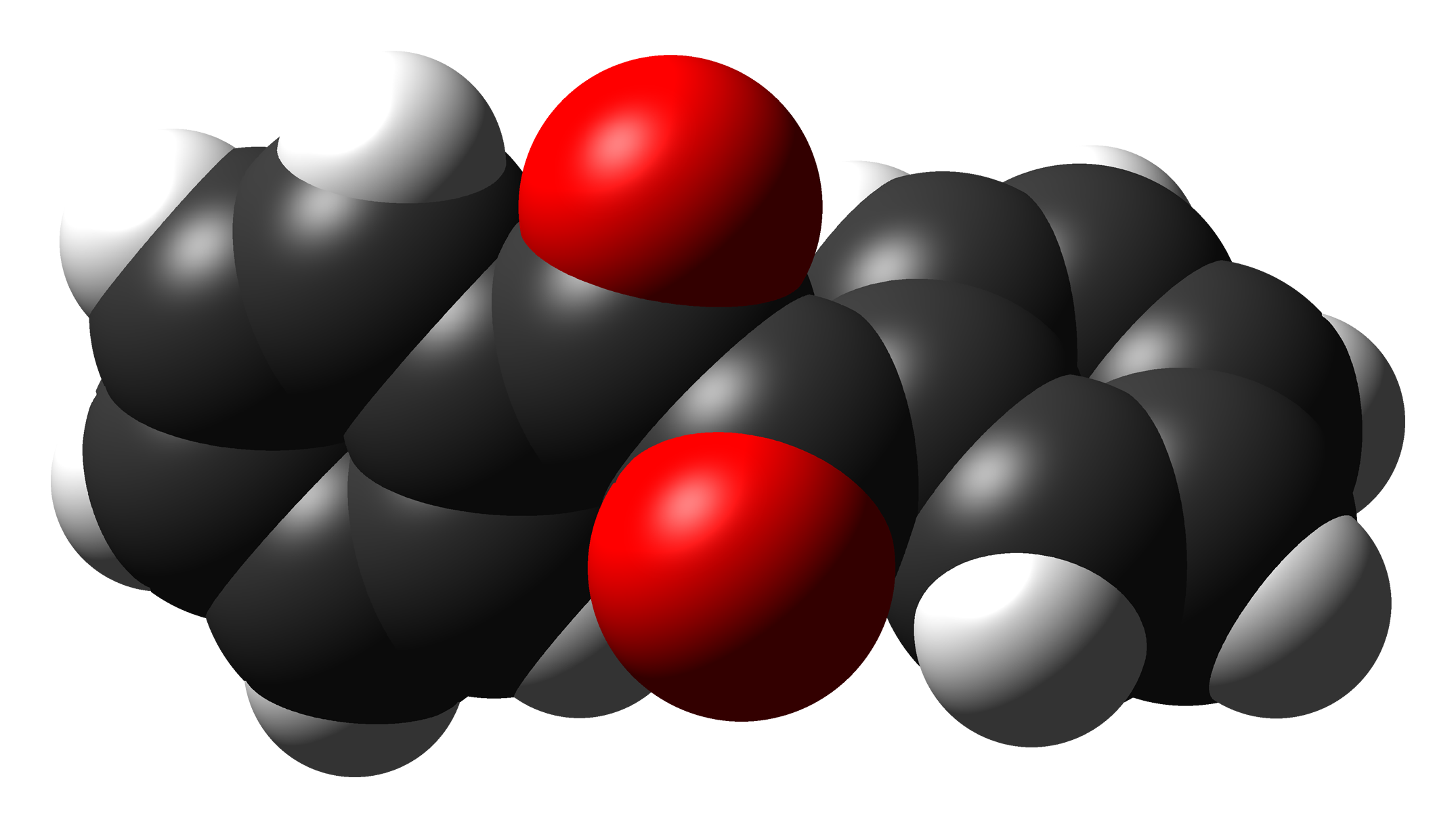

Names
- Preferred IUPAC name Diphenylethanedione
- Systematic IUPAC name 1,2-Diphenylethane-1,2-dione
- Other names Diphenylethane-1,2-dione; Benzil; Dibenzoyl; Bibenzoyl; Diphenylglyoxal

Identifiers
CAS Number	134-81-6
3D model (JSmol)	Interactive image; Interactive image
Beilstein Reference	608047
ChEBI	CHEBI:51507
ChEMBL	ChEMBL189886
ChemSpider	8329
ECHA InfoCard	100.004.689
EC Number	205-157-0
PubChem CID	8651
RTECS number	DD1925000
UNII	S85X61172J
CompTox Dashboard (EPA)	DTXSID3044380
- InChI: InChI=1S/C14H10O2/c15-13(11-7-3-1-4-8-11)14(16)12-9-5-2-6-10-12/h1-10H Key: WURBFLDFSFBTLW-UHFFFAOYSA-N; InChI=1/C14H10O2/c15-13(11-7-3-1-4-8-11)14(16)12-9-5-2-6-10-12/h1-10H Key: WURBFLDFSFBTLW-UHFFFAOYAZ
- SMILES: O=C(C(=O)c1ccccc1)c2ccccc2; c1ccccc1C(=O)C(=O)c2ccccc2

Properties
Chemical formula	C_{14}H_{10}O_{2}
Molar mass	210.232 g·mol^{−1}
Appearance	yellow crystalline powder
Density	1.521 g/cm^{3}, solid (1.255 g/cm^{3}, x-ray)
Melting point	94.0 to 96.0 °C; 201.2 to 204.8 °F; 367.1 to 369.2 K
Boiling point	346.0 to 348.0 °C; 654.8 to 658.4 °F; 619.1 to 621.1 K
Solubility in water	insoluble
Solubility in ethanol	soluble
Solubility in diethyl ether	soluble
Solubility in benzene	soluble
Magnetic susceptibility (χ)	−118.6·10^{−6} cm^{3}/mol

Structure
Crystal structure	P3_{1,2}21
Dipole moment	3.8 D

Hazards
- Occupational safety and health (OHS/OSH)
Main hazards	Irritant
- GHS labelling
Pictograms	(GHS07: Exclamation mark)
Signal word	Warning
Hazard statements	H315, H319, H335
Precautionary statements	P261, P264, P271, P280, P302+P352, P304+P340, P305+P351+P338, P312, P321, P332+P313, P337+P313, P362, P403+P233, P405, P501
NFPA 704 (fire diamond)	2 1 0
- Lethal dose or concentration (LD, LC)
LD_{50} (median dose)	>3 g/kg (mouse, oral)

Related compounds
Related diketones	diacetyl
Related compounds	benzophenone glyoxal bibenzil
- Except where otherwise noted, data are given for materials in their standard state (at 25 °C [77 °F], 100 kPa). verify (what is ?) Infobox references

Benzil (i.e. Bz_{2}, systematically known as 1,2-diphenylethane-1,2-dione) is the organic compound with the formula (C_{6}H_{5}CO)_{2}, generally abbreviated (PhCO)_{2}. This yellow solid is one of the most common diketones. Its main use is as a photoinitiator in polymer chemistry.

== Structure ==
The compound's most noteworthy structural feature is the long carbon-carbon bond of 1.54 Å, which indicates the absence of pi-bonding between the two carbonyl centers. The PhCO centers are planar, but the pair of benzoyl groups are twisted with respect to the other with a dihedral angle of 117°. In less hindered analogues (glyoxal, biacetyl, oxalic acid derivatives), the (RCO)_{2} group adopts a planar, anti-conformation.

== Applications ==
Benzil can function as a photoinitiator in the free-radical curing of polymers. Upon exposure to ultraviolet (UV) radiation, it may initiate polymerisation through two distinct photochemical pathways. Irradiation at wavelengths below 330 nm causes a Type I Norrish reaction that produces benzoyl radicals capable of initiating free-radical polymerisation. At wavelengths above 330 nm, benzil is promoted to an excited triplet state, from which it can initiate polymerisation through hydrogen atom abstraction. However, it is a relatively poor photoinitiator, and is seldom used. It undergoes photobleaching, which allows the curing light to reach deeper layers of the material on longer exposure. Acetal derivatives, such as 2,2-dimethoxy-2-phenylacetophenone, have better properties for this application.

Benzil is a potent inhibitor of human carboxylesterases, enzymes involved in the hydrolysis of carboxylesters and many clinically used drugs.

=== Reactions ===
Benzil is a standard building block in organic synthesis. It condenses with amines to give diketimine ligands. A classic organic reaction of benzil is the benzilic acid rearrangement, in which potassium hydroxide catalyses the conversion of benzil to benzilic acid. This reactivity is exploited in the preparation of the drug phenytoin. Benzil also reacts with 1,3-diphenylacetone in an aldol condensation to give tetraphenylcyclopentadienone.

== Preparation ==
Benzil is prepared from benzoin, for example with copper(II) acetate:

PhC(O)CH(OH)Ph + 2 Cu^{2+} → PhC(O)C(O)Ph + 2 H^{+} + 2 Cu^{+}

Other suitable oxidizing agents such as nitric acid (HNO_{3}) are used routinely.

Iron(III) chloride (FeCl_{3}) can be used as an inexpensive catalyst for this chemical conversion.
