= Vera Yevstafievna Popova =

Russian chemist (1867–1896)

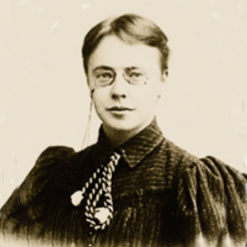
- Born: Vera Yevstafievna Bogdanovskaya; 17 September 1867; Saint Petersburg, Russian Empire
- Died: 8 May 1896 (aged 28) (Gregorian calendar); 26 April (Julian Calendar). Izhefskii Zavod, Russian Empire
- Cause of death: Explosion
- Known for: Early Russian chemist
- Spouse: General Jacob Kozmich Popov
- Parent(s): Yevstafy Ivanovich Bogdanovsky and Maria Alexeyevna Bogdanovskaya

Vera Yevstafievna Popova (Russian: Вера Евстафьевна Попова) (née Bogdanovskaya; 17 September 1867 – 8 May 1896) was a Russian chemist. She was one of the first female chemists in Russia, and the first Russian female author of a chemistry textbook. She "probably became the first woman to die in the cause of chemistry" as a result of an explosion in her laboratory.

== Early life and education ==
Vera Bogdanovskaya was born in 1867 in Saint Petersburg. Her father, Evstafy Ivanovich Bogdanovsky, was a professor of surgery. Her parents arranged for their three children to be educated at home. In 1878, she began studying at the Smolny Institute at the age of 11. Starting in 1883 she spent four years at the Bestuzhev Courses and after this she worked for two years in laboratories at the Academy of Sciences and the Military Surgical Academy. In 1889 Bogdanovskaya left Russia for Switzerland, where she undertook a doctorate in chemistry at the University of Geneva. She defended her research into dibenzyl ketone in 1892. Bogdanovskaya wanted to work on H-C≡P (methylidynephosphane), but had been persuaded to concentrate instead on dibenzyl ketone by her doctoral supervisor, Professor Carl Gräbe. She also worked with Dr Philippe Auguste Guye in Geneva, who was working on stereochemistry.

== Career ==
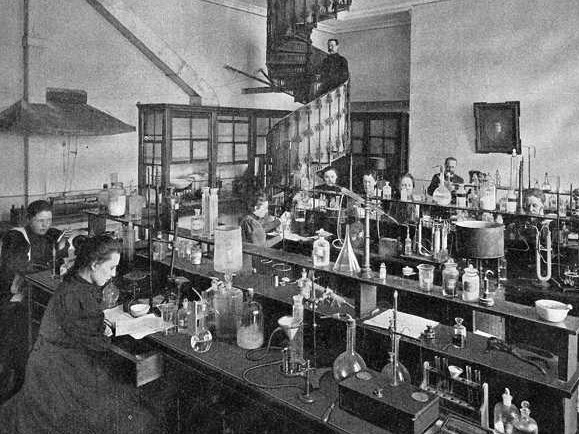
Students at the Bestuzhev Courses' chemistry laboratory

Bogdanovskaya returned to Saint Petersburg in 1892 to work at the Bestuzhev Courses, where she taught chemistry. This was an institution founded in 1878 to encourage Russian women to stay in Russia to study. She was working as an assistant to Prof. L'vov teaching the first courses in stereochemistry. Her reputation as a lecturer and her knowledge of teaching enabled her to write her first book, a textbook on basic chemistry. She wrote reviews, translated academic papers on chemistry and, together with her professor, published the works of Alexander Butlerov, who had died in 1886. Between 1891 and 1894, she published a number of papers based on her doctoral thesis.

She was not just a chemist; she was also interested in entomology, writing and languages. In 1889, she published a description of work with bees. Bogdanovskaya published her own short stories, as well as her translations of the French short-story writer Guy de Maupassant.

== Personal life ==
Bogdanovskaya left Saint Petersburg and married General Jacob Kozmich Popov in 1895. He was older than she and a director of a military steel plant, and she demanded that he build her a laboratory where she could continue her chemistry. They lived in Izhevskii Zavod, a town under military control that was dedicated to weapon manufacture. It has been suggested that her marriage may have been one of convenience.

== Death ==
Popova died on 8 May 1896 (Gregorian calendar; 26 April in the Julian Calendar), (the date is sometimes given as 1897 in English sources) as the result of an explosion that occurred while she was attempting to synthesize H-C≡P (methylidynephosphane), a chemical similar to hydrogen cyanide. She was 28.

=== Aftermath ===
H−C≡P, the chemical that she was trying to synthesize at the time of her death, was not successfully created until 1961 from phosphine and carbon. It is extremely pyrophoric and polymerizes easily at temperatures above −120 °C. Its triple point is −124 °C and it burns spontaneously even at low temperatures when exposed to air.

== Legacy ==
Popova was given a substantial tribute in the Journal of the Russian Physical Chemical Society. A shorter obituary appeared in the journal Nature and a brief notice in the American journal Science. One report by the chemist Vladimir Ipatieff suggested that she might have been poisoned by her experiment or have committed suicide, but this view was not supported by other reports.

Her early death led to a fund being created in her memory by her husband to assist female students. Her portrait was also displayed at the Women's College where she had trained.

Popova is credited with classifying dibenzyl ketone. This laid the foundation for synthetic acrylic resins created from acetone cyanohydrin.
