= Dibenzyl ketone =

- Skeletal formula

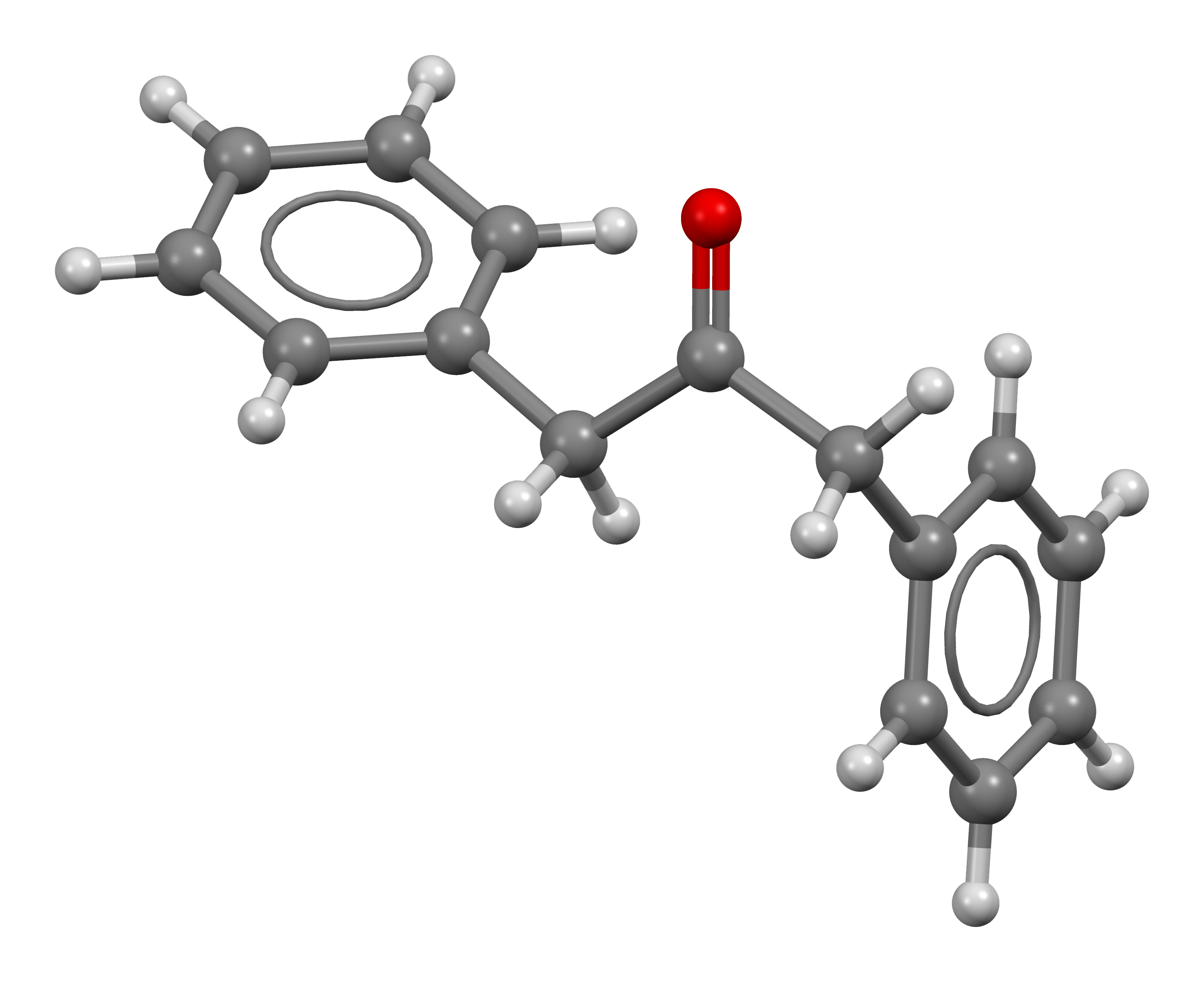
- Ball-and-stick model

Names
- Preferred IUPAC name 1,3-Diphenylpropan-2-one
- Other names 1,3-Diphenylacetone

Identifiers
CAS Number	102-04-5
3D model (JSmol)	Interactive image
ChEBI	CHEBI:174059
ChEMBL	ChEMBL4083314
ChemSpider	21105887
ECHA InfoCard	100.002.728
EC Number	203-000-0
PubChem CID	7593
UNII	9Y07G5UDKQ
CompTox Dashboard (EPA)	DTXSID5059244
- InChI: InChI=1S/C15H14O/c16-15(11-13-7-3-1-4-8-13)12-14-9-5-2-6-10-14/h1-10H,11-12H2 Key: YFKBXYGUSOXJGS-UHFFFAOYSA-N; InChI=1/C15H14O/c16-15(11-13-7-3-1-4-8-13)12-14-9-5-2-6-10-14/h1-10H,11-12H2 Key: YFKBXYGUSOXJGS-UHFFFAOYAS
- SMILES: O=C(Cc1ccccc1)Cc2ccccc2

Properties
Chemical formula	C_{15}H_{14}O
Molar mass	210.276 g·mol^{−1}
Appearance	white solid
Density	1.069 g/cm^{3}
Melting point	32 to 34 °C (90 to 93 °F; 305 to 307 K)
Boiling point	330 °C (626 °F; 603 K)
Magnetic susceptibility (χ)	−131.7·10^{−6} cm^{3}/mol

Hazards
Flash point	149.4 °C (300.9 °F; 422.5 K)
- Except where otherwise noted, data are given for materials in their standard state (at 25 °C [77 °F], 100 kPa). verify (what is ?) Infobox references

Dibenzyl ketone, or 1,3-diphenylacetone, is an organic compound composed of two benzyl groups attached to a central carbonyl group. This results in the central carbonyl carbon atom being electrophilic and the two adjacent carbon atoms slightly nucleophilic. For this reason, dibenzyl ketone is frequently used in an aldol condensation reaction with benzil (a dicarbonyl) and base to create tetraphenylcyclopentadienone. Vera Bogdanovskaia is credited with the classification of dibenzyl ketone.

== Preparation ==
Dibenzyl ketone is prepared by ketonic decarboxylation of phenylacetic acid. One method is where phenylacetic acid is reacted with acetic anhydride and anhydrous potassium acetate and refluxed for two hours at 140−150 °C. The mixture is distilled slowly so that the distillate is mostly acetic acid. Carbon dioxide is released in this reaction. The resultant liquid is a mixture of dibenzyl ketone and minor impurities. Heating the mixture above 200−205 °C leads to resinification with a decrease in the yield of the ketone.
