= 2-Ethyl-4,5-dimethylphenol =

Chemical compound

Names
- Preferred IUPAC name 2-Ethyl-4,5-dimethylphenol

Identifiers
CAS Number	2219-78-5
3D model (JSmol)	Interactive image
ChemSpider	216635
ECHA InfoCard	100.181.645
PubChem CID	247477
UNII	7CX4CE64WG
CompTox Dashboard (EPA)	DTXSID30289588
- InChI: InChI=1S/C10H14O/c1-4-9-5-7(2)8(3)6-10(9)11/h5-6,11H,4H2,1-3H3 Key: ZUDAICPAUJSPHK-UHFFFAOYSA-N; InChI=1/C10H14O/c1-4-9-5-7(2)8(3)6-10(9)11/h5-6,11H,4H2,1-3H3 Key: ZUDAICPAUJSPHK-UHFFFAOYAJ
- SMILES: CCC1=C(C=C(C(=C1)C)C)O

Properties
Chemical formula	C_{10}H_{14}O
Molar mass	150.221 g·mol^{−1}
- Except where otherwise noted, data are given for materials in their standard state (at 25 °C [77 °F], 100 kPa). Infobox references

2-Ethyl-4,5-dimethylphenol is a phenol found in the essential oil of rosemary (Rosmarinus officinalis). It is also found in female elephant urine samples.
