= 1,1,4,4-Tetraphenylbutadiene =

Tetraphenyl butadiene

Names
- Preferred IUPAC name 1,1′,1′′,1′′′-(Buta-1,3-diene-1,1,4,4-tetrayl)tetrabenzene
- Other names TPB

Identifiers
CAS Number	1450-63-1
ChemSpider	66678
ECHA InfoCard	100.014.468
PubChem CID	74060
RTECS number	CY9040630
UNII	3J9DS4FWS7
CompTox Dashboard (EPA)	DTXSID4061701
- InChI: InChI=1S/C28H22/c1-5-13-23(14-6-1)27(24-15-7-2-8-16-24)21-22-28(25-17-9-3-10-18-25)26-19-11-4-12-20-26/h1-22H Key: KLCLIOISYBHYDZ-UHFFFAOYSA-N

Properties
Chemical formula	C_{28}H_{22}
Molar mass	358.484 g·mol^{−1}
Appearance	White to yellow white needles
Density	1.079 g/cm^{3}
Melting point	203.5 °C (398.3 °F; 476.6 K)
Solubility	soluble in ethanol, benzene, chloroform, acetic acid

Hazards
- GHS labelling
Pictograms	(GHS07: Exclamation mark)
Signal word	Warning
Hazard statements	H315, H319, H335
Precautionary statements	P261, P264, P271, P280, P302+P352, P304+P340, P305+P351+P338, P312, P321, P332+P313, P337+P313, P362, P403+P233, P405, P501
NFPA 704 (fire diamond)	2 0 0
Flash point	289 °C (552 °F; 562 K)
Safety data sheet (SDS)	Sigma-Aldrich
- Except where otherwise noted, data are given for materials in their standard state (at 25 °C [77 °F], 100 kPa). verify (what is ?) Infobox references

1,1,4,4-tetraphenylbutadiene (TPB) is an organic compound with the formula (C_{6}H_{5})_{2}C=CHCH=C(C_{6}H_{5})_{2}. Other isomers are possible, but the term usually refers to the derivative of butadiene with two phenyl group on each of the terminal carbon atoms It is a white solid that has attracted some attention as an electroluminescent dye.

The compound was first prepared by double dehydration of the diol.

It glows blue with an emission spectrum peak wavelength at 430 nm, It is useful as a wavelength shifter.

== Related compounds ==
1,2,3,4-Tetraphenylbutadiene ((C_{6}H_{5})CH=C(C_{6}H_{5})C(C_{6}H_{5})=CH(C_{6}H_{5})) is also well-known.
