= Cyclopentadienone =

Names
- Preferred IUPAC name Cyclopenta-2,4-dien-1-one

Identifiers
CAS Number	13177-38-3
3D model (JSmol)	Interactive image
ChemSpider	122931
PubChem CID	139405
CompTox Dashboard (EPA)	DTXSID80157203
- InChI: InChI=1S/C5H4O/c6-5-3-1-2-4-5/h1-4H Key: FQQOMPOPYZIROF-UHFFFAOYSA-N; InChI=1/C5H4O/c6-5-3-1-2-4-5/h1-4H Key: FQQOMPOPYZIROF-UHFFFAOYAD
- SMILES: C1=CC(=O)C=C1

Properties
Chemical formula	C_{5}H_{4}O
Molar mass	80.086 g·mol^{−1}
- Except where otherwise noted, data are given for materials in their standard state (at 25 °C [77 °F], 100 kPa). Infobox references

Cyclopentadienone is an organic compound with molecular formula C_{5}H_{4}O. The parent cyclopentadienone is rarely encountered, because it rapidly dimerizes. Many substituted derivatives are known, notably tetraphenylcyclopentadienone. Such compounds are used as ligands in organometallic chemistry.

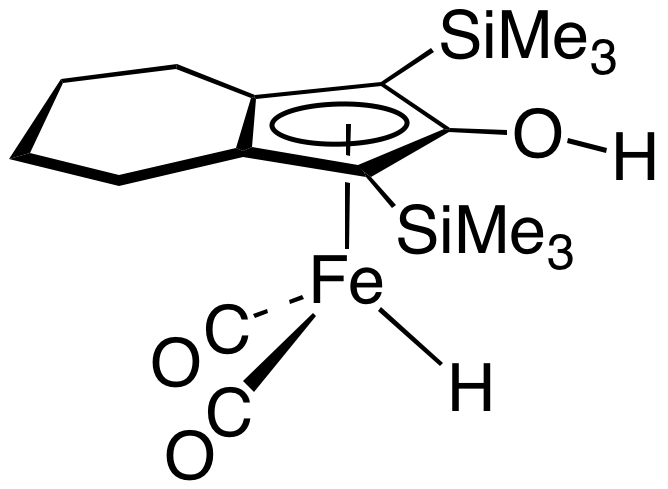
The Knölker complex, derived from a substituted cyclopentadienone, is a catalyst for transfer hydrogenation.

== Preparation ==
Cyclopentadienone can be generated by the photolysis or pyrolysis of various substances (e.g. 1,2-benzoquinone), and then isolated in an argon matrix at 10 K (−263 °C). It dimerizes readily upon thawing the matrix at 38 K (−235 °C).

== See also ==
- Dienone
