= 1-Phenyl-2-propanols =

1-Phenyl-2-propanol

1-Phenyl-2-propanols is a class of compounds based on the chemical structure of 1-phenyl-2-propanol; these compounds are central nervous system depressants and apparently exhibit acute toxicity in animals.

== Сhemistry ==
From a chemical standpoint, these are alcohols, specifically a secondary alcohol. The molecules consist of a propane chain (3 carbon atoms) in which: a phenyl radical (benzene ring — C_{6}H_{5}) is attached to the first carbon atom (C_{1}), a hydroxyl group (OH) is substituted at the second carbon atom (C_{2}), and the third carbon atom (C_{3}) represents a terminal methyl group (CH_{3}). The C_{2} carbon is an asymmetric center, and therefore, this substance exists as two optical isomers: levorotatory and dextrorotatory, respectively. Indeed, they are related to amphetamines (C_{9}H_{13}N).

== Pharmacology ==
=== Pharmacodynamics ===
In experimental animals (mice and rats), 1-phenyl-2-propanols induced rapid ataxia (loss of motor coordination) and a sedative effect; upon reaching the effective dose, a complete loss of the righting reflex occurred. The animals became unresponsive to painful stimuli (paw and tail pinching), and at toxic doses, death resulted from respiratory depression, or less frequently, hypersalivation.
