= Chrysanthenone =

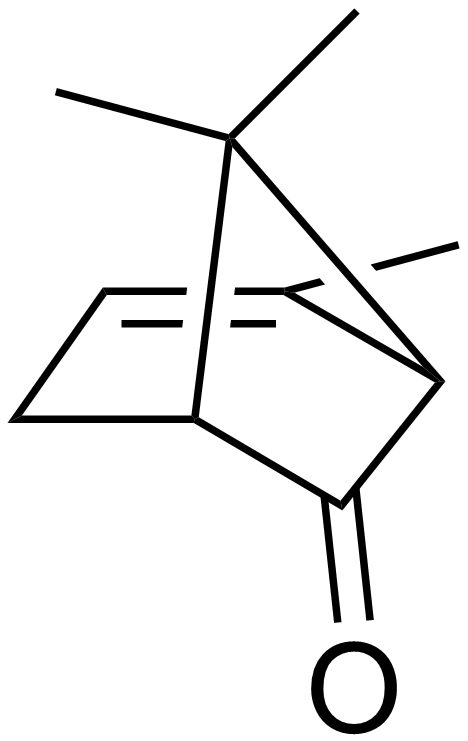

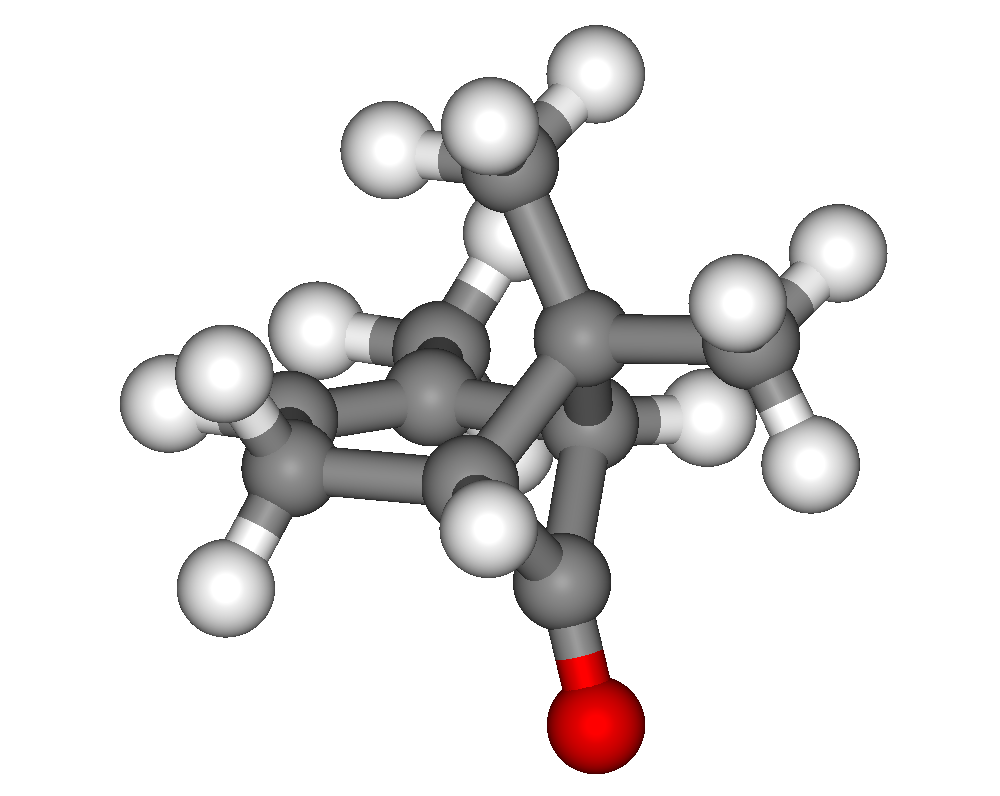

Names
- IUPAC name 2,7,7-Trimethylbicyclo[3.1.1]hept-2-en-6-one
- Other names 2-Pinen-7-one

Identifiers
CAS Number	473-06-3
3D model (JSmol)	Interactive image
ChEBI	CHEBI:3681
ChemSpider	390901
KEGG	C11394
PubChem CID	442463
UNII	841NXH6XEV
CompTox Dashboard (EPA)	DTXSID80894868
- InChI: InChI=1S/C10H14O/c1-6-4-5-7-9(11)8(6)10(7,2)3/h4,7-8H,5H2,1-3H3 Key: IECBDTGWSQNQID-UHFFFAOYSA-N; InChI=1/C10H14O/c1-6-4-5-7-9(11)8(6)10(7,2)3/h4,7-8H,5H2,1-3H3 Key: IECBDTGWSQNQID-UHFFFAOYAO
- SMILES: O=C1C2/C(=C\CC1C2(C)C)C

Properties
Chemical formula	C_{10}H_{14}O
Molar mass	150.22 g/mol
- Except where otherwise noted, data are given for materials in their standard state (at 25 °C [77 °F], 100 kPa). verify (what is ?) Infobox references

Chrysanthenone (C_{10}H_{14}O) is a terpenoid. It can be produced from its isomer verbenone in a photochemical rearrangement reaction.
