= 2,2-Dimethoxy-2-phenylacetophenone =

Chemical compound

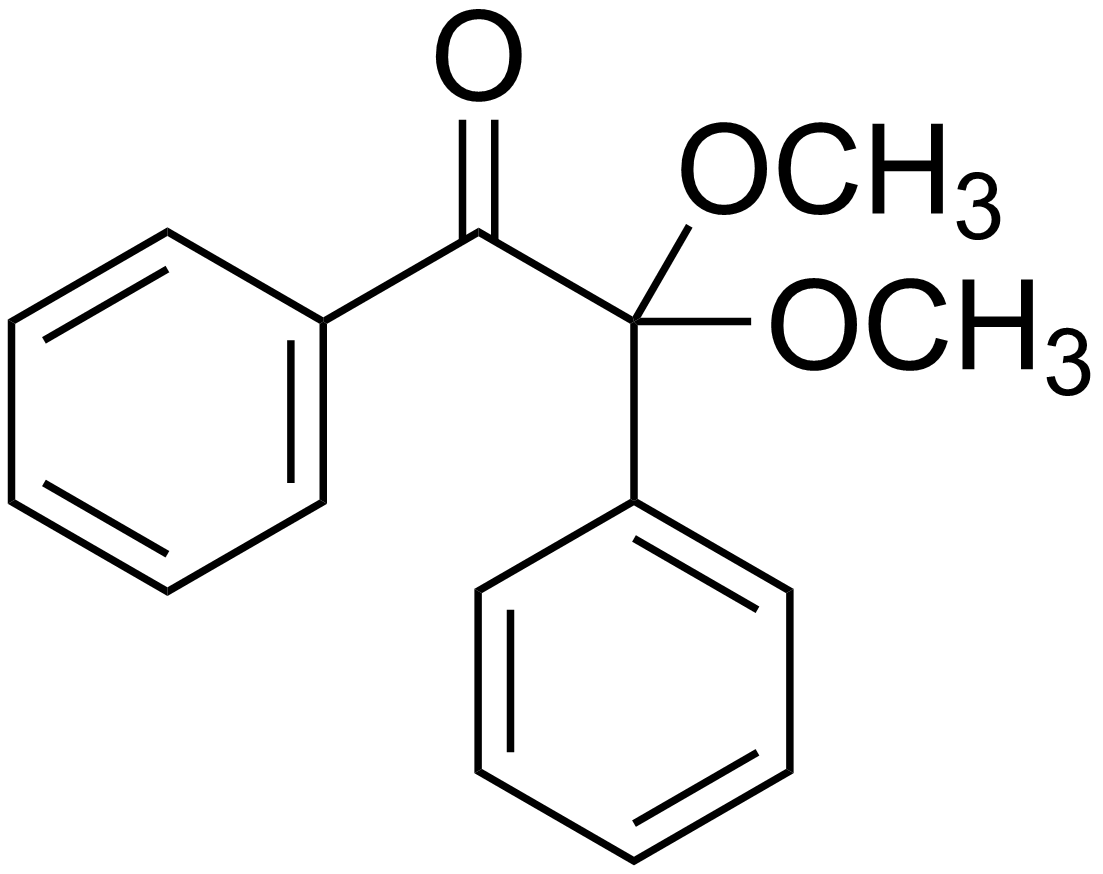

Names
- Preferred IUPAC name 2,2-Dimethoxy-1,2-diphenylethan-1-one
- Other names 2,2-Dimethoxy-2-phenylacetophenone α,α-Dimethoxy-α-phenylacetophenone; Benzil α,α-dimethyl acetal

Identifiers
CAS Number	24650-42-8
3D model (JSmol)	Interactive image
Abbreviations	DMPA
ChEMBL	ChEMBL364734
ChemSpider	81777
ECHA InfoCard	100.042.154
PubChem CID	90571
UNII	1DK0094V28
CompTox Dashboard (EPA)	DTXSID7037715
- InChI: InChI=1S/C16H16O3/c1-18-16(19-2,14-11-7-4-8-12-14)15(17)13-9-5-3-6-10-13/h3-12H,1-2H3 Key: KWVGIHKZDCUPEU-UHFFFAOYSA-N; InChI=1/C16H16O3/c1-18-16(19-2,14-11-7-4-8-12-14)15(17)13-9-5-3-6-10-13/h3-12H,1-2H3 Key: KWVGIHKZDCUPEU-UHFFFAOYAK
- SMILES: O=C(c1ccccc1)C(OC)(OC)c2ccccc2

Properties
Chemical formula	C_{16}H_{16}O_{3}
Molar mass	256.301 g·mol^{−1}
- Except where otherwise noted, data are given for materials in their standard state (at 25 °C [77 °F], 100 kPa). verify (what is ?) Infobox references

2,2-Dimethoxy-2-phenylacetophenone is a photoinitiator, which is used to initialize radical polymerization e.g. in the preparation of acrylate polymers. Under the influence of light the molecule will form radicals which initiate the radical polymerization. It can also be used as an initiator in the process of making an integrated circuit.
