= Cumyl alcohol =

Names
- IUPAC name (4-Propan-2-ylphenyl)methanol
- Other names: Cuminyl alcohol; Cuminol; 4-Isopropylbenzyl alcohol

Identifiers
CAS Number	536-60-7
3D model (JSmol)	Interactive image
ChEMBL	ChEMBL3183500
ChemSpider	21105932
ECHA InfoCard	100.007.857
EC Number	208-640-4
PubChem CID	325
UNII	V261W8XR62
CompTox Dashboard (EPA)	DTXSID0021626
- InChI: InChI=1S/C10H14O/c1-8(2)10-5-3-9(7-11)4-6-10/h3-6,8,11H,7H2,1-2H3 Key: OIGWAXDAPKFNCQ-UHFFFAOYSA-N
- SMILES: CC(C)C1=CC=C(C=C1)CO

Properties
Chemical formula	C_{10}H_{14}O
Molar mass	150.221 g·mol^{−1}
Odor	Caraway
Density	0.974-0.982
Melting point	28 °C (82 °F; 301 K)
log P	2.370
Refractive index (n_{D})	1.518-1.525

Hazards
- GHS labelling
Pictograms	(GHS07: Exclamation mark)
Signal word	Warning
Hazard statements	H302
Precautionary statements	P264, P270, P301+P317, P330, P501
- Except where otherwise noted, data are given for materials in their standard state (at 25 °C [77 °F], 100 kPa). Infobox references

Cumyl alcohol, also called 4-isopropylbenzyl alcohol, is a liquid, hydroxy functional, aromatic organic chemical with formula C_{10}H_{14}O. It has the CAS Registry Number of 536-60-7 and the IUPAC name of (4-propan-2-ylphenyl)methanol. It is REACH registered with the EC number of 208-640-4.

== Uses ==
The most common use is as a food additive to add flavor. The material also has insect repellent properties.

== Manufacture ==
Hydrogenation of cuminal can produce cumyl alcohol.

== Other ==
Cumyl alcohol is an undesired side reaction product when LDPE is crosslinked. LDPE is used as a plastic electric insulator for electrical power cables. The cumyl alcohol reduces the insulating properties.

== Alternative names ==
Main sources of information.

- p-Cymen-7-ol
- 4-isopropylbenzyl alcohol
- Cumic alcohol
- Cuminol
- Cuminyl alcohol
- (4-Isopropylphenyl)methanol
- Cuminic alcohol

== Toxicology ==
The toxicity of the material has been studied and is reasonably well understood.
