= O-sec-Butylphenol =

o-sec-Butylphenol

Names
- Preferred IUPAC name 2-(Butan-2-yl)phenol
- Other names 2-(1-Methylpropyl)phenol; 2-(sec-Butyl)phenol; 2-sec-Butylphenol; 2-(2-Butyl)phenol

Identifiers
| CAS Number | 89-72-5 |
| 3D model (JSmol) | Interactive image |
| ChemSpider | 6718 |
| ECHA InfoCard | 100.001.758 |
| PubChem CID | 6984 |
| RTECS number | SJ8920000 |
| UNII | 025P24OTM5 |
| UN number | 3145 |
| CompTox Dashboard (EPA) | DTXSID2022331 |
- InChI: InChI=1S/C10H14O/c1-3-8(2)9-6-4-5-7-10(9)11/h4-8,11H,3H2,1-2H3 Key: NGFPWHGISWUQOI-UHFFFAOYSA-N; InChI=1/C10H14O/c1-3-8(2)9-6-4-5-7-10(9)11/h4-8,11H,3H2,1-2H3 Key: NGFPWHGISWUQOI-UHFFFAOYAN
- SMILES: CCC(C)C1=CC=CC=C1O

Properties
| Chemical formula | C_{10}H_{14}O |
| Molar mass | 150.221 g·mol^{−1} |
| Appearance | Colorless to amber-colored liquid or solid |
| Density | 0.97724 g/cm^{3} (20 °C) |
| Melting point | 16 °C; 61 °F; 289 K |
| Boiling point | 230 °C (446 °F; 503 K) |
| Vapor pressure | 4.74 Pa (25 °C) |
| Refractive index (n_{D}) | 1.5228 (20 °C) |

Hazards
| Flash point | 107 °C; 225 °F; 380 K |
- Lethal dose or concentration (LD, LC)
| LD_{50} (median dose) | >290 ppm/4 hours (inhalation, rat) 63 mg/kg (intraperitoneal, mouse); 60 mg/kg (intravenous, mouse); 600 mg/kg (oral, guinea pig); 320 mg/kg (oral, rat); 600 mg/kg (skin, guinea pig); 5560 mg/kg (skin, rabbit) |
- NIOSH (US health exposure limits)
| REL (Recommended) | 5 ppm (30 mg/m^{3}) [skin] |
- Except where otherwise noted, data are given for materials in their standard state (at 25 °C [77 °F], 100 kPa). Infobox references

o-sec-Butylphenol is an industrial chemical used in dyeing and as a chemical intermediate. It is synthesized from phenol and 1-butene in an ortho-alkylation reaction. It is corrosive to the eyes, skin, and gastrointestinal tract.

== Applications ==
o-sec-Butylphenol is used in the synthesis of the fragrance chemical Freskomenthe, which is itself used in the synthesis of Metambrate and Dihydro Ambrate.

Another use is in the synthesis of a carbamate insecticide fenobucarb.

A third foreseeable use is in the synthesis of osteoanabolic agents.
