= 1,2,3,4-Tetraphenylbutadiene =

Names
- Preferred IUPAC name 1,1′,1′′,1′′′-[(1E,3E)-Buta-1,3-diene-1,2,3,4-tetrayl]tetrabenzene

Identifiers
CAS Number	635-438-7
3D model (JSmol)	Interactive image
ChemSpider	4526743
ECHA InfoCard	100.163.327
EC Number	635-438-7
PubChem CID	5377766
- InChI: InChI=1S/C28H22/c1-5-13-23(14-6-1)21-27(25-17-9-3-10-18-25)28(26-19-11-4-12-20-26)22-24-15-7-2-8-16-24/h1-22H/b27-21+,28-22+ Key: DAABVBOFAIYKNX-GPAWKIAZSA-N
- SMILES: C1=CC=C(C=C1)/C=C(/C(=C/C2=CC=CC=C2)/C3=CC=CC=C3)\C4=CC=CC=C4

Properties
Chemical formula	C_{28}H_{22}
Molar mass	358.484 g·mol^{−1}
Appearance	white solid
Density	1.19 g/cm^{3}

Hazards
- GHS labelling
Pictograms	(GHS07: Exclamation mark)
Signal word	Warning
Hazard statements	H302, H315, H319, H335, H413
Precautionary statements	P261, P264, P264+P265, P270, P271, P273, P280, P301+P317, P302+P352, P304+P340, P305+P351+P338, P319, P321, P330, P332+P317, P337+P317, P362+P364, P403+P233, P405, P501
- Except where otherwise noted, data are given for materials in their standard state (at 25 °C [77 °F], 100 kPa). Infobox references

1,2,3,4-Tetraphenylbutadiene is an organic compound with the formula [(C_{6}H_{5})CH=C(C_{6}H_{5})]_{2}. It is a white solid.

The compound is prepared by reductive coupling of diphenylacetylene using lithium metal followed by hydrolysis of the resulting 1,4-dilithiobutadiene:

2 PhC≡CPh + 2 Li → LiCPh=CPh−CPh=CPhLi (Ph = C_{6}H_{5})
LiCPh=CPh−CPh=CPhLi + 2 H_{2}O → PhCH=CPh−CPh=CHPh + 2 LiOH

1,4-Dilithiobutadiene is a precursor to several metallacycles by salt metathesis reactions:

LiCPh=CPh−CPh=CPhLi + RMCl_{2} → Ph_{4}C_{4}MR + 2 LiCl (RM = PhP, PhAs, PhSb)

== Structure ==
The isomer with mutually cis phenyl groups is common. According to X-ray crystallography, the phenyl groups are significantly rotated out of the plane of the 1,3-butadiene core.

== Related compounds ==
1,1,4,4-Tetraphenylbutadiene is an isomer of 1,2,3,4-tetraphenylbutadiene with two phenyl group on each of the terminal carbon atoms of the diene. It has attracted some attention as an electroluminescent dye.
