= Penguinone =

Organic compound

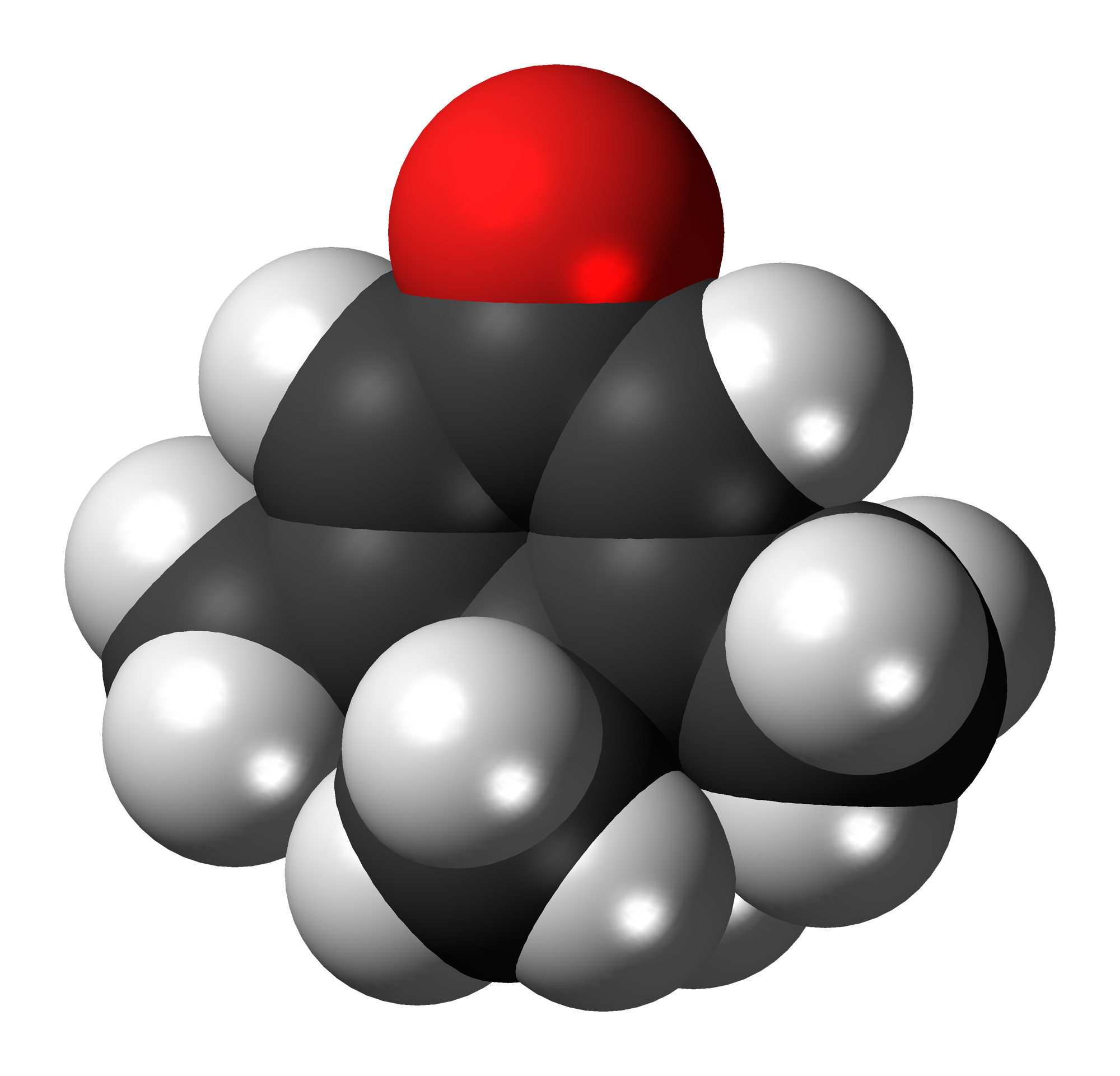

Names
- Preferred IUPAC name 3,4,4,5-Tetramethylcyclohexa-2,5-dienone

Identifiers
CAS Number	34014-87-4
3D model (JSmol)	Interactive image
ChemSpider	10338857
PubChem CID	12564106
UNII	JZ985K46ZX
CompTox Dashboard (EPA)	DTXSID70502708
- InChI: InChI=1S/C10H14O/c1-7-5-9(11)6-8(2)10(7,3)4/h5-6H,1-4H3 Key: RHIYIMQPIGYWEK-UHFFFAOYSA-N; InChI=1/C10H14O/c1-7-5-9(11)6-8(2)10(7,3)4/h5-6H,1-4H3 Key: RHIYIMQPIGYWEK-UHFFFAOYAI
- SMILES: CC1=CC(=O)C=C(C1(C)C)C

Properties
Chemical formula	C_{10}H_{14}O
Molar mass	150.221 g·mol^{−1}
- Except where otherwise noted, data are given for materials in their standard state (at 25 °C [77 °F], 100 kPa). Infobox references

Penguinone is an organic compound with the molecular formula C_{10}H_{14}O. Its name comes from the fact that its 2-dimensional molecular structure resembles a penguin.

The suffix "-one" indicates that it is a ketone. The systematic name of the molecule is 3,4,4,5-tetramethylcyclohexa-2,5-dienone.

Although it is a dienone and thus has the necessary structure for a dienone–phenol rearrangement, the methyl groups in positions 3 and 5 of the ring block the movement of the group at position 4, so even the action of trifluoroacetic acid will not cause transformation to a phenol.

== See also ==
- List of chemicals with unusual names
- NanoPutian
- Penguin diagram
