= Levoverbenone =

Chemical compound

Clinical data
- ATC code: R05CA11 (WHO)

Identifiers
- IUPAC name: (1S,5S)-4,6,6-trimethylbicyclo[3.1.1]hept-3-en-2-one
- CAS Number: 1196-01-6
- PubChem CID: 92874
- ChemSpider: 83838
- UNII: 2XP0J7754U
- ChEBI: CHEBI:78316
- ChEMBL: ChEMBL2426701
- CompTox Dashboard (EPA): DTXSID9035620
- ECHA InfoCard: 100.013.461

Chemical and physical data
- Formula: C_{10}H_{14}O
- Molar mass: 150.221 g·mol^{−1}
- 3D model (JSmol): Interactive image
- SMILES: O=C1\C=C(/[C@@H]2C[C@H]1C2(C)C)C
- InChI: InChI=1S/C10H14O/c1-6-4-9(11)8-5-7(6)10(8,2)3/h4,7-8H,5H2,1-3H3/t7-,8+/m0/s1; Key:DCSCXTJOXBUFGB-JGVFFNPUSA-N

Levoverbenone is an expectorant. It is the (−)-isomer of verbenone.
