= 2-Methyl-1-phenyl-2-propanol =

Names
- IUPAC name 2-methyl-1-phenylpropan-2-ol
- Other names Dimethyl benzyl carbinol

Identifiers
CAS Number	100-86-7
3D model (JSmol)	Interactive image
ChEBI	CHEBI:195903
ChEMBL	ChEMBL3183743
ChemSpider	7250
ECHA InfoCard	100.002.633
PubChem CID	7531
UNII	N95NCI59MI
CompTox Dashboard (EPA)	DTXSID1047601
- InChI: InChI=1S/C10H14O/c1-10(2,11)8-9-6-4-3-5-7-9/h3-7,11H,8H2,1-2H3 Key: RIWRBSMFKVOJMN-UHFFFAOYSA-N
- SMILES: CC(C)(CC1=CC=CC=C1)O

Properties
Chemical formula	C_{10}H_{14}O
Molar mass	150.221 g·mol^{−1}
Appearance	colourless to pale yellow viscous liquid or white crystalline solid
Density	0.972-0.977 g/cm^{3}
Melting point	23–25 °C (73–77 °F; 296–298 K)
Boiling point	214–216 °C (417–421 °F; 487–489 K) (17.3 hPa)
Solubility in water	soluble in ethanol and mineral oil, most vegetable oils and propylene glycol; insoluble in water

Hazards
- GHS labelling
Pictograms	(GHS07: Exclamation mark)
Signal word	Warning
Hazard statements	H302
Precautionary statements	P264, P270, P301+P317, P330, P501
- Except where otherwise noted, data are given for materials in their standard state (at 25 °C [77 °F], 100 kPa). Infobox references

2-Methyl-1-phenyl-2-propanol It is an aromatic organic compound that is a tertiary alcohol. This compound is used as an ingredient in perfumery and is a neurotoxin that causes acute organic solvent poisoning (solvent-induced toxic encephalopathy).

== Properties ==
A colorless or pale yellow viscous liquid or white crystalline substance has a warm, herbaceous, floral aroma. It is soluble in ethanol, mineral oil, most vegetable oils, and propylene glycol; insoluble in water, used as a flavoring agent and added to food products.

== Toxicity ==
2-Methyl-1-phenyl-2-propanol causes somnolence, coma, and gastritis in rodent oral lethal dose studies. It has been studied in animals and is known, at least, to act as a central nervous system depressant in rats. In guinea pigs, oral administration also resulted in coma, gastritis, and increased urine volume. The substance demonstrates higher tolerability when applied to rabbit skin, although this sharply contrasts with its oral LD_{50} value for rats (1280 mg/kg) and low dermal toxicity in rabbits (>5 g/kg). This compound causes solvent-induced toxic encephalopathy.
