= Verbenone =

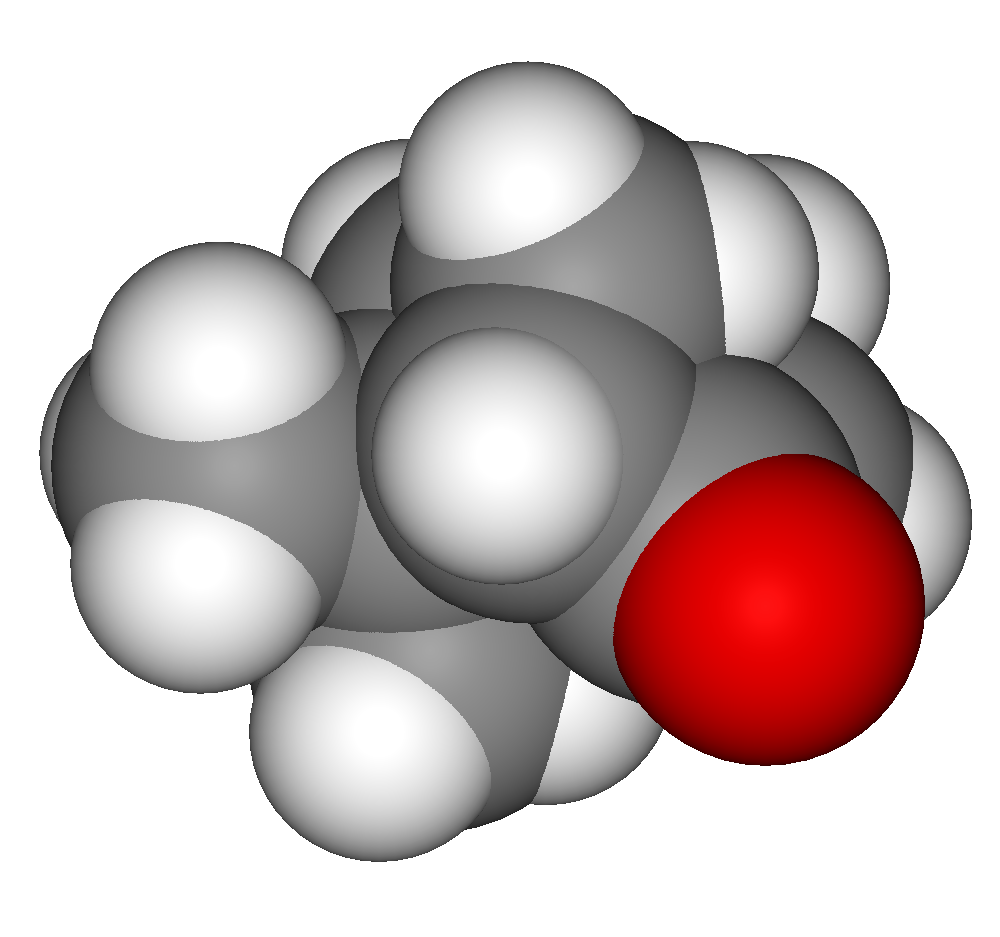
Verbenone

Names
- IUPAC name rel-(1R,5R)-Pin-2-en-4-one
- Systematic IUPAC name rel-(1R,5R)-4,6,6-Trimethylbicyclo[3.1.1]hept-3-en-2-one
- Other names Verbenone; 2-Pinen-4-one

Identifiers
CAS Number	80-57-9
3D model (JSmol)	Interactive image
ChEBI	CHEBI:9955
ChemSpider	59147
ECHA InfoCard	100.001.176
KEGG	C09913
PubChem CID	65724
UNII	IFV46DXC6U
CompTox Dashboard (EPA)	DTXSID2048115
- InChI: InChI=1S/C10H14O/c1-6-4-9(11)8-5-7(6)10(8,2)3/h4,7-8H,5H2,1-3H3/t7-,8+/m1/s1 Key: DCSCXTJOXBUFGB-SFYZADRCSA-N; InChI=1/C10H14O/c1-6-4-9(11)8-5-7(6)10(8,2)3/h4,7-8H,5H2,1-3H3/t7-,8+/m1/s1 Key: DCSCXTJOXBUFGB-SFYZADRCBG
- SMILES: CC1=CC(=O)[C@@H]2C[C@H]1C2(C)C

Properties
Chemical formula	C_{10}H_{14}O
Molar mass	150.221 g·mol^{−1}
Density	0.978 g/cm^{3}
Melting point	6.5 °C (43.7 °F; 279.6 K)
Boiling point	227 to 228 °C (441 to 442 °F; 500 to 501 K)
- Except where otherwise noted, data are given for materials in their standard state (at 25 °C [77 °F], 100 kPa). verify (what is ?) Infobox references

Verbenone is a natural organic compound classified as a terpene that is found naturally in a variety of plants. The chemical has a pleasant characteristic odor. Besides being a natural constituent of plants, it and its analogs are insect pheromones. In particular, verbenone when formulated in a long-lasting matrix has an important role in the control of bark beetles such as the mountain pine beetle and the Southern pine bark beetle.

== Chemistry ==
Verbenone is a monoterpene, to be specific a bicyclic ketone terpene. It is the primary constituent of the oil of Spanish verbena, hence its name; it is also found in the oil of rosemary. It is nearly insoluble in water, but miscible with most organic solvents.

Verbenone can be readily prepared synthetically by the oxidation of the more common terpene α-pinene:

Verbenone can then be converted into chrysanthenone through a photochemical rearrangement reaction:

== Use for insect control ==
The southern pine beetle (Dendroctonus frontalis), a bark beetle, is a major threat to pine trees in the southeastern United States. Its reproductive cycle is controlled by varying ratios of certain natural chemicals, including verbenone. To reproduce, pine bark beetles aggregate in large numbers in their host pine trees. At the beginning of an attack, various chemicals produced by infested trees and by the beetles attract additional beetles of the same species. When the numbers of adults and larvae approach the maximum that the tree can support, antiaggregation signal chemicals, i.e., verbenone, are produced, reducing the likelihood that additional beetles will land and attack the tree. Forest managers frequently try to control infestations of the Southern pine bark beetle by cutting down and sometimes burning infested trees and nearby healthy trees. They then place verbenone formulations on nearby susceptible healthy trees to repel and confuse the beetles.

Verbenone is also used to manage mountain pine beetle (Dendroctonus ponderosae) infestations. Verbenone is recognized by the mountain pine beetle, a notable forest insect capable of causing extensive levels of tree mortality in western North America. Several formulations of verbenone have been registered with the U.S. Environmental Protection Agency for tree protection. Failures in tree protection efficacy can be seen in situations where there is an excessive population of infesting insects, for example an area which contains more than 50 percent infested trees. Loss of response to verbenone as a repellent is not due to any particular failure of the verbenone devices but is instead a response innate to the biology of the beetles which allows populations to continue flourishing even in situations of extreme environmental stress.

Verbenone is also used to manage redbay ambrosia beetle (Xyleborus glabratus) the vector of the fungus that causes laurel wilt. In 2020, a 9-month trial in forest demonstrated a reduction in the number of beetles landing on redbay and a reduction in redbay mortality

== Other uses ==
Because of its pleasant aroma, verbenone (or essential oils high in verbenone content) are used in perfumery, aromatherapy, herbal teas, spices, and herbal remedies. (−)-Verbenone is used as a cough suppressant under the name levoverbenone. Verbenone may also have antimicrobial properties.
