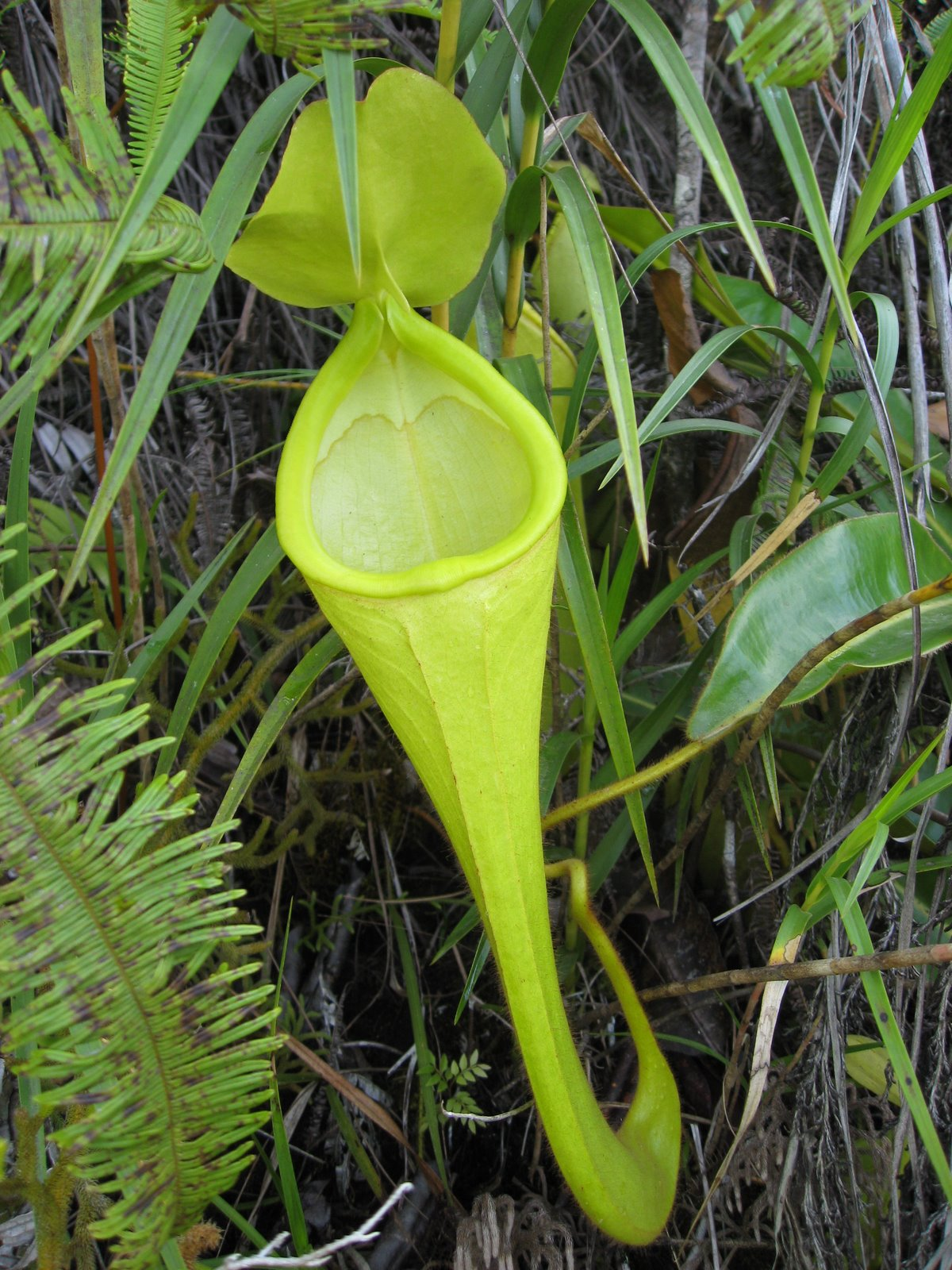
- An upper pitcher of Nepenthes chaniana

Conservation status
- Endangered (IUCN 3.1)

Scientific classification
- Kingdom: Plantae
- Clade: Tracheophytes
- Clade: Angiosperms
- Clade: Eudicots
- Order: Caryophyllales
- Family: Nepenthaceae
- Genus: Nepenthes
- Species: N. chaniana

Binomial name
- Nepenthes chaniana C.Clarke, Chi.C.Lee & S.McPherson (2006)

= Nepenthes chaniana =

Species of pitcher plant from Borneo

Nepenthes chaniana (/nɪˈpɛnθiːz ˌtʃæniˈɑːnə/; after Datuk Chan Chew Lun, Managing Director of Natural History Publications) is a tropical pitcher plant species belonging to the genus Nepenthes. It is characterised by a dense indumentum of long, white hairs. Pitchers are cylindrical and mostly white to yellow in colouration. Nepenthes chaniana belongs to the loosely defined "N. maxima complex", which also includes, among other species, N. boschiana, N. epiphytica, N. eymae, N. faizaliana, N. fusca, N. klossii, N. maxima, N. platychila, N. stenophylla, and N. vogelii.

Cultivated plants of this species were for a long time misidentified as N. pilosa. While N. pilosa is endemic to Kalimantan, N. chaniana is native to Sabah and Sarawak (Bukit Batu Lawi and other mountains). The pitchers of N. pilosa are rounder and broader in shape than those of N. chaniana.

The type specimen of N. chaniana was collected by Charles Clarke on Mount Alab, the highest peak in Crocker Range National Park.

== Natural hybrids ==
- ? N. albomarginata × N. chaniana
- N. chaniana × N. veitchii

Plants identified by Charles Clarke as a hybrid between N. chaniana (known as N. pilosa at the time) and N. lowii are now thought to represent N. fusca × N. lowii.
