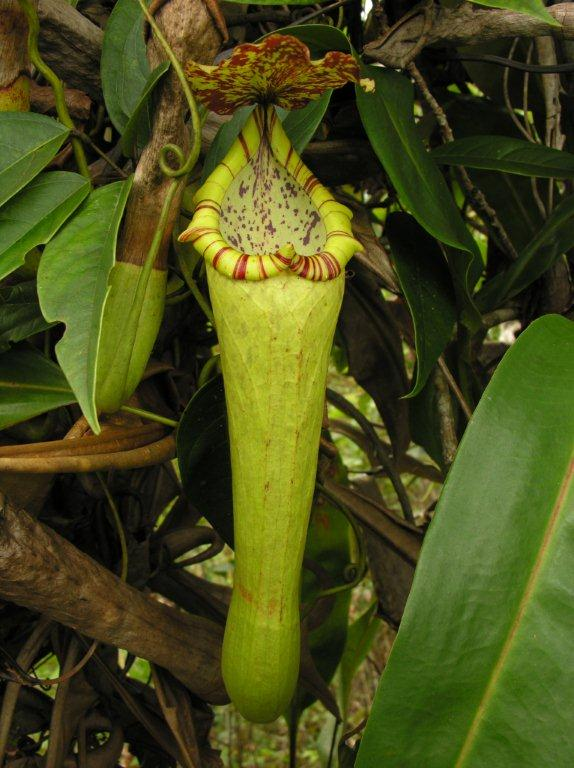
- A giant upper pitcher of N. boschiana from Mount Sakumbang

Conservation status
- Endangered (IUCN 2.3)

Scientific classification
- Kingdom: Plantae
- Clade: Tracheophytes
- Clade: Angiosperms
- Clade: Eudicots
- Order: Caryophyllales
- Family: Nepenthaceae
- Genus: Nepenthes
- Species: N. boschiana

Binomial name
- Nepenthes boschiana Korth. (1839)
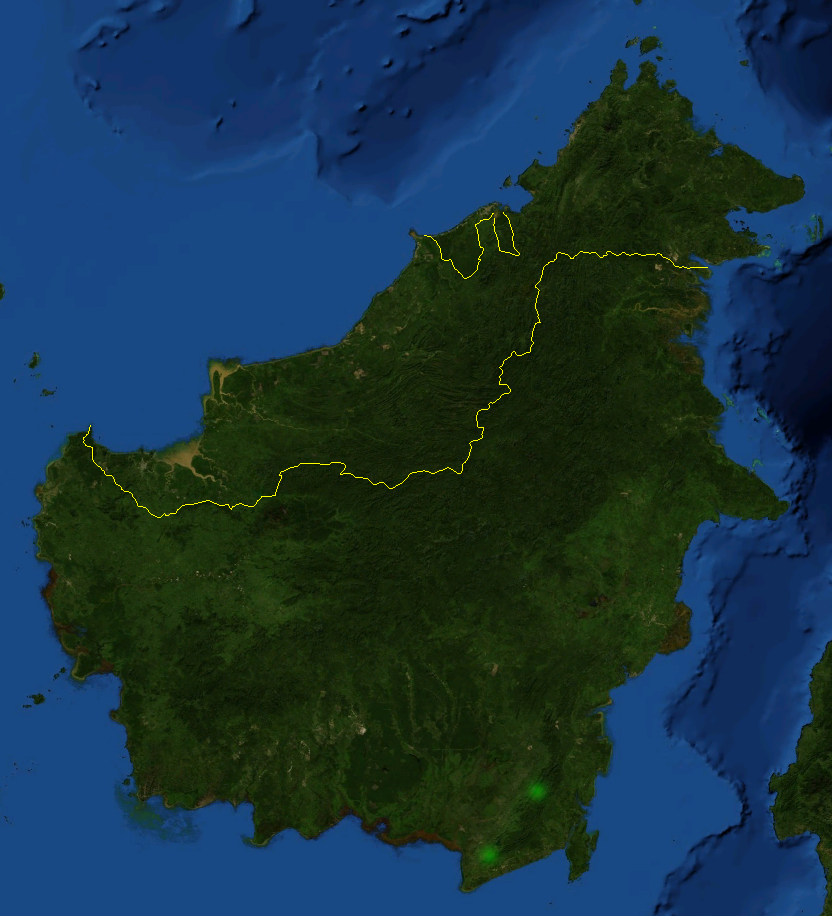
- Distribution of N. boschiana.

Synonyms
- Synonyms: Nepenthes borneensis J.H.Adam & Wilcock (1989); Nepenthes boschea Rafarin (1869) sphalm.typogr.; Nepenthes maxima auct. non Reinw. ex Nees: Becc. (1886) [=N. boschiana/N. maxima/ N. stenophylla/N. sumatrana]; Heterochresonyms: Nepenthes boschiana auct. non Korth.: Low (1848); Macfarl. (1908) [=N. boschiana/N. stenophylla]; Nepenthes boschiana auct. non Korth.: Miq. (1860) [=N. boschiana/N. sumatrana]; Nepenthes boschiana auct. non Korth.: Becc. (1878) [=N. maxima]

= Nepenthes boschiana =

Species of pitcher plant from Borneo

Nepenthes boschiana (/nɪˈpɛnθiːz ˌbɒʃiˈɑːnə/; after Johannes van den Bosch), or Bosch's pitcher-plant, is a tropical pitcher plant endemic to the Meratus Mountains in South Kalimantan, Indonesian Borneo. It is most closely allied to N. faizaliana. Nepenthes borneensis is considered a synonym of this species. Nepenthes boschiana has no known natural hybrids. No valid forms or varieties have been described. Nepenthes boschiana belongs to the loosely defined "N. maxima complex", which also includes, among other species, N. chaniana, N. epiphytica, N. eymae, N. faizaliana, N. fusca, N. klossii, N. maxima, N. platychila, N. stenophylla, and N. vogelii.

The species was formally described by Pieter Willem Korthals in his 1839 monograph, "Over het geslacht Nepenthes". B. H. Danser, in his 1928 monograph "The Nepenthaceae of the Netherlands Indies", wrote the following:

Korthals states the natives who accompanied him on Mt. Sakoembang gathered the not yet opened pitchers, as the water which they contained was a medicament against inflammation of the eyes, whereas others cut the opened pitchers as playthings for their children. He describes the habitat as sterile, open and stony. The vernacular name 'daoen sompitan' is translated by him as blow-pipe-leaf; according to dictionaries this is right.

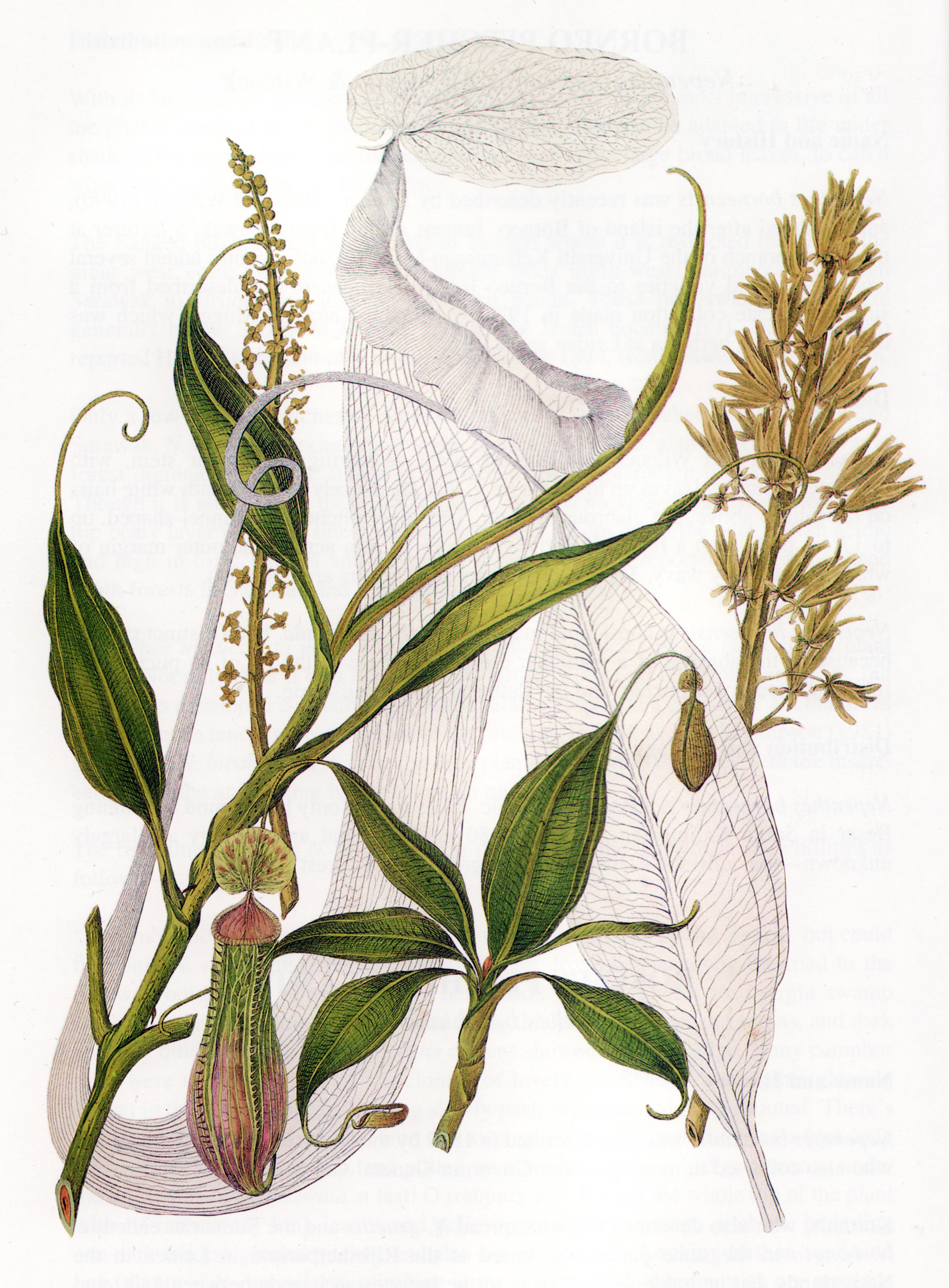
Original illustration of N. boschiana from 1839 by Pieter Willem Korthals

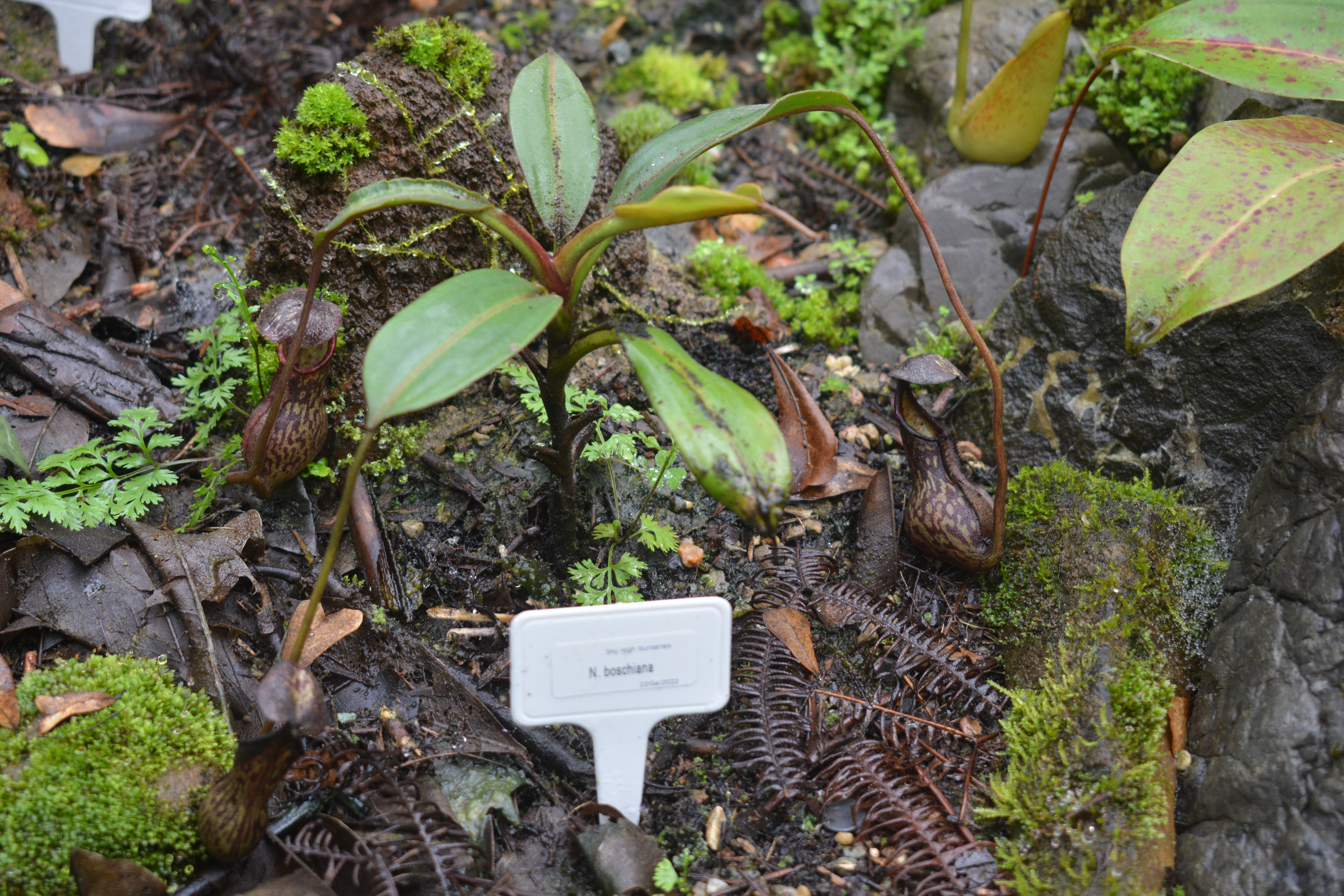
Specimen in the Bogor Botanical Gardens

== Infraspecific taxa ==
- Nepenthes boschiana var. lowii Hook.f. (1873) [=N. stenophylla]
- Nepenthes boschiana var. sumatrana Miq. (1858) [=N. sumatrana]
