= Nepenthes epiphytica =

Scientific classification
- Kingdom: Plantae
- Clade: Tracheophytes
- Clade: Angiosperms
- Clade: Eudicots
- Order: Caryophyllales
- Family: Nepenthaceae
- Genus: Nepenthes
- Species: N. epiphytica

Binomial name
- Nepenthes epiphytica A.S.Rob., Nerz & Wistuba (2011)

Synonyms
- Nepenthes fusca subsp. kostermansiana J.H.Adam & Wilcock ex Jebb & Cheek (1997)

Species of pitcher plant from Borneo

Nepenthes epiphytica is a tropical pitcher plant known only from the Berau and East Kutai Regencies of East Kalimantan, Borneo, where it grows at an elevation of around 1,000 m above sea level. Prior to its formal description as a species, N. epiphytica was considered to be a variant of the closely related N. fusca. Nepenthes epiphytica belongs to the loosely defined "N. maxima complex", which also includes, among other species, N. boschiana, N. chaniana, N. eymae, N. faizaliana, N. fusca, N. klossii, N. maxima, N. platychila, N. stenophylla, and N. vogelii.

The specific epithet epiphytica refers to the epiphytic habit of this species.
