= Nepenthes curtisii (disambiguation) =

Nepenthes curtisii may refer to:

- Nepenthes curtisii Mast. (1887) — synonym of N. maxima
- Nepenthes curtisii auct. non Mast.: Lauffenburger (1995) — horticultural hybrid (N. maxima × N. albomarginata)
- Nepenthes curtisii auct. non Mast.: J.H.Adam & Wilcock (1996) — synonym of N. stenophylla
- Nepenthes curtisii subsp. zakriana J.H.Adam & Wilcock (1996) — synonym of N. fusca
- Nepenthes curtisii var. hybrida Witte (1897) — horticultural hybrid (N. maxima × ?N. veitchii)
- Nepenthes curtisii var. superba Hort.Veitch ex Marshall (1889) — synonym of N. maxima
