= Nepenthes platychila =

Scientific classification
- Kingdom: Plantae
- Clade: Tracheophytes
- Clade: Angiosperms
- Clade: Eudicots
- Order: Caryophyllales
- Family: Nepenthaceae
- Genus: Nepenthes
- Species: N. platychila

Binomial name
- Nepenthes platychila Chi.C.Lee (2002)
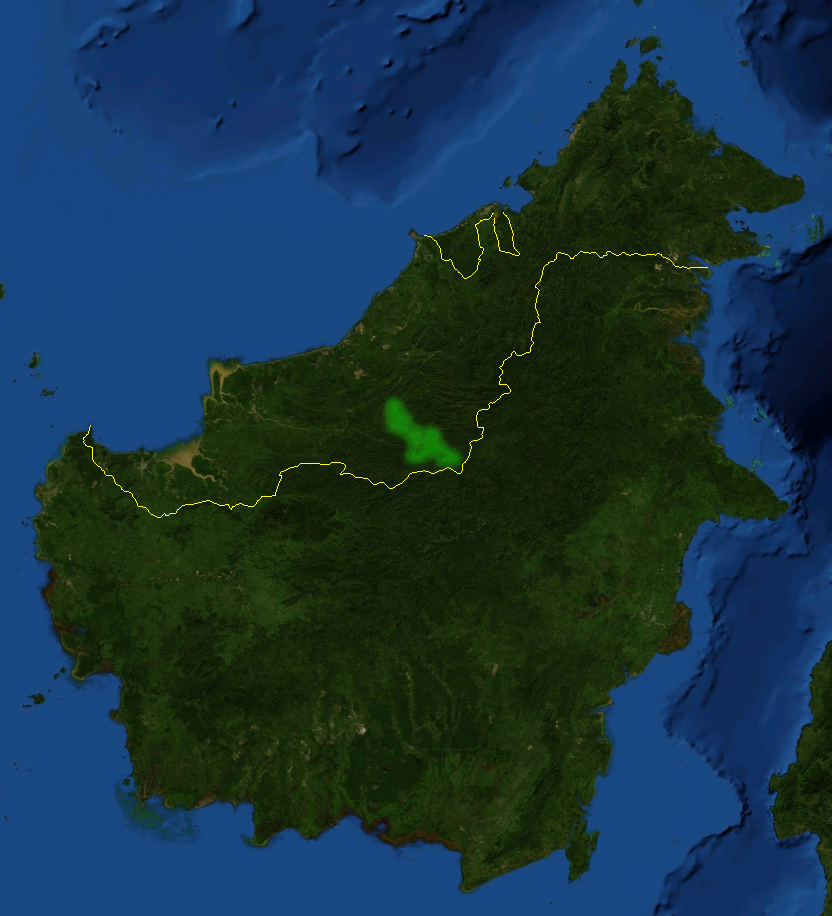
- Distribution of N. platychila.

Synonyms
- Informal names: Nepenthes sp. 'B' Chi.C.Lee (2002)

Species of carnivorous plant

Nepenthes platychila (/nɪˈpɛnθiːz ˌplætɪˈkaɪlə/; from Greek for "flat-lipped") is a tropical pitcher plant endemic to the Hose Mountains of central Sarawak. It is notable for its smooth peristome and funnel-shaped upper pitchers. Nepenthes platychila belongs to the loosely defined "N. maxima complex", which also includes, among other species, N. boschiana, N. chaniana, N. epiphytica, N. eymae, N. faizaliana, N. fusca, N. klossii, N. maxima, N. stenophylla, and N. vogelii.

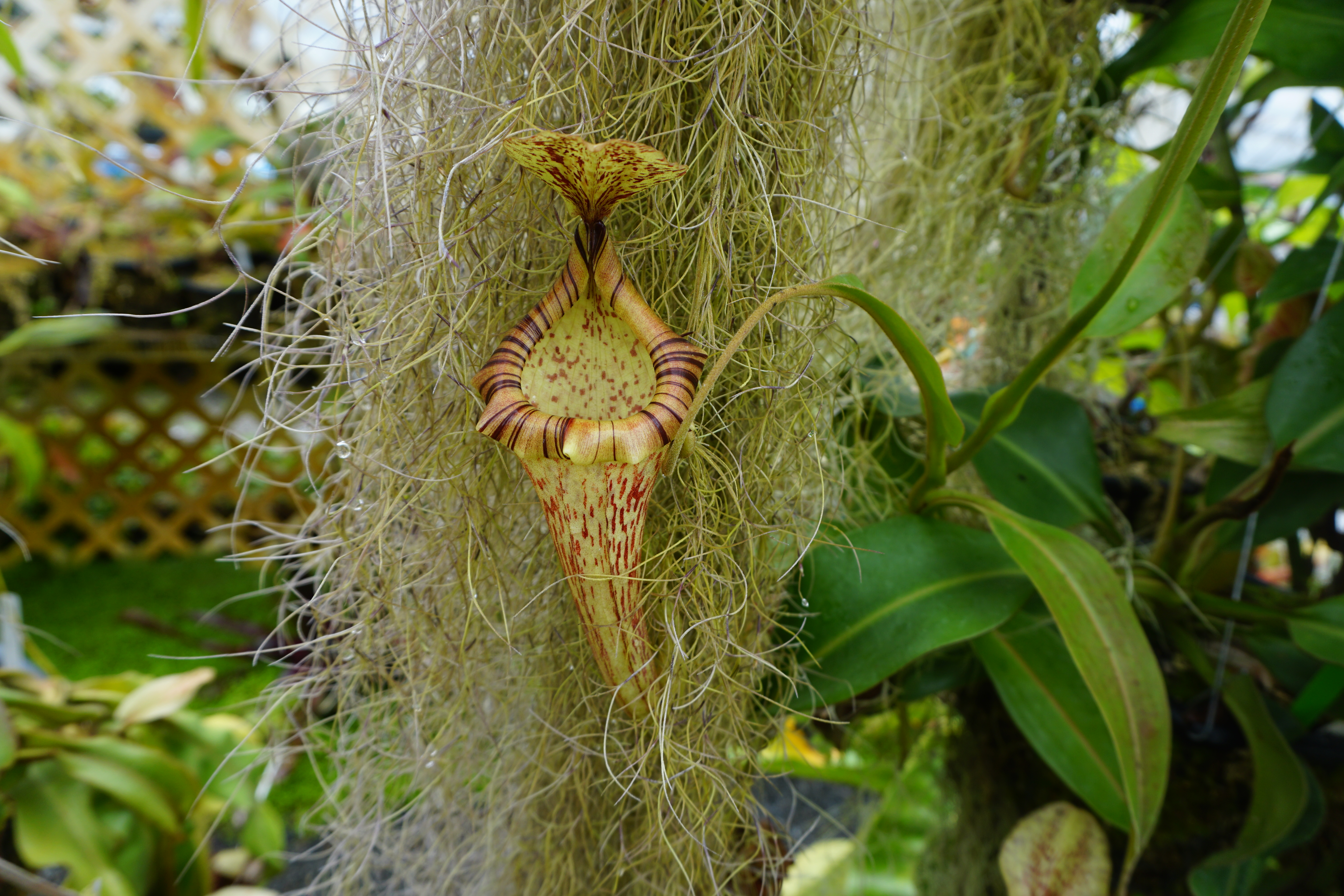
An intermediate/upper pitcher of Nepenthes platychila, grown in cultivation by California Carnivores.

Nepenthes platychila was included in a 2002 report on the Nepenthes of the Hose Mountains under the placeholder name Nepenthes sp. 'B'.

== Natural hybrids ==
- N. fusca × N. platychila
