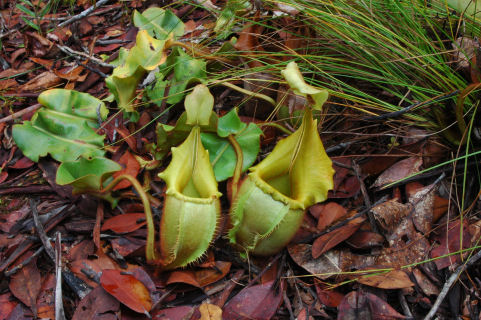
- Nepenthes veitchii from Bario, Sarawak

Conservation status
- Least Concern (IUCN 3.1)

Scientific classification
- Kingdom: Plantae
- Clade: Tracheophytes
- Clade: Angiosperms
- Clade: Eudicots
- Order: Caryophyllales
- Family: Nepenthaceae
- Genus: Nepenthes
- Species: N. veitchii

Binomial name
- Nepenthes veitchii Hook.f. (1859)

Synonyms
- Synonyms: Nepenthes lanata Lindl. ex Mast. (1872); Nepenthes sanguinea auct. non Lindl.: Mast. (1882); Nepenthes villosa auct. non Hook.f.: Hook. (1858) [=N. veitchii/N. villosa]; Heterochresonyms: Nepenthes veitchii auct. non Hook.f.: Endert (1927) [=N. fusca]

= Nepenthes veitchii =

Species of pitcher plant from Borneo

Nepenthes veitchii (/nɪˈpɛnθiːz ˈveɪtʃiaɪ, - ˈviːtʃ-/; after James Veitch, nurseryman of the Veitch Nurseries), or Veitch's pitcher-plant, is a Nepenthes species from the island of Borneo. The plant is widespread in north-western Borneo and can also be found in parts of Kalimantan. It grows in lowland Dipterocarp forest, typically near rivers, and on ridgetops in mossy forests, from 0 to 1,600 meters elevation. Nepenthes veitchii usually grows as an epiphyte, though the form from Bario seems to be strictly terrestrial and has not been observed to climb trees.

Frederick William Burbidge described the growth habit of N. veitchii in The Gardeners' Chronicle as follows:

Now as to N. Veitchii. This is a true epiphyte. I never met with it on the ground anywhere, but in great quantity 20—100 feet high on tree trunks. Its distichous habit is unique, I fancy, and then some of the leaves actually clasp around the tree just as a man would fold his arms around it in similar circumstances. No other species of Nepenthes, so far as I know, has this habit.

Odoardo Beccari found N. veitchii on the top of Mount Santubong in 1865. He wrote the following account of his discovery:

This is one of the finest and rarest of all pitcher-plants. ... Some of the specimens I got measured quite ten inches in length. The mouth of the pitcher in this species is certainly its most conspicuous and remarkable part by reason of its rich orange colour and its vertical position. It is also a perfect trap to entice insects into its interior, attracting them from a distance by its bright colours. Sir Joseph Hooker compares the mouth of the pitchers of N. veitchii to the gills of a fish, to which, indeed, with their narrow lamellae converging to the centre, they bear considerable resemblance.

Nepenthes veitchii is thought to be closely related to N. robcantleyi from the Philippines. It has also been compared to N. truncata.

== Infraspecific Taxa ==
The following infraspecific taxa of N. veitchii have been described. Both are nomina nuda and are not considered valid today.

- Nepenthes veitchii f. barioensis Hort. ex Y.Fukatsu (1999) nom.nud.
- Nepenthes veitchii var. striata Hort.Veitch (1892) nom.nud.

== Natural Hybrids ==
The following natural hybrids involving N. veitchii have been recorded.

- N. albomarginata × N. veitchii
- N. chaniana × N. veitchii
- ? N. faizaliana × N. veitchii
- N. fusca × N. veitchii [=?N. hurrelliana]
- N. hurrelliana × N. veitchii [=?(N. fusca × N. veitchii) × N. veitchii]
- N. lowii × N. veitchii
- N. stenophylla × N. veitchii
