= Frederik Endert =

Dutch botanist (1891–1953)

Frederik Hendrik Endert (1891 in Semarang, Java – 1953 in Bussum, Netherlands) was a Dutch botanist and plant collector.

In 1915, Endert was appointed a Forest Officer in the Dutch East Indies Forest Service. From 1918 he worked closely with the Forest Research Institute at Buitenzorg (now Bogor), Java. In 1925, Endert accompanied a plant collecting expedition to central Borneo (Midden-Oost-Borneo-Expeditie), during which he collected Nepenthes fusca and Nepenthes mollis for the first time. In 1938 he was stationed at Makassar in southwestern Sulawesi, tasked with the supervision of the forests. In 1941 he was appointed Secretary of the Committee for Economic Plants. In May 1949, Endert returned to the Forest Research Institute at Buitenzorg to compile information on Indonesian timber varieties. He retired in 1952, and travelled to the Netherlands in July of the same year. Endert died in 1953 in Bussum, North Holland.

A number of plants from the Malay Archipelago are named after him, including the tree genus Endertia.
