= Anthea Phillipps =

Botanist

Datin Anthea Phillipps B.Sc. (born 3 June 1955) is a British botanist based in Sabah, Malaysia, specialising in pitcher plants and rhododendrons.

== Research ==
Phillipps received a Botany degree from the University of Durham, England. She then worked at the Sabah Museum before joining the Sabah Parks service from 1980 to 1987 as Park Ecologist, where she studied rhododendrons and pitcher plants.

Phillipps helped to establish the Herbarium and the Botanical Garden at Kinabalu Park. She collected samples of Hornstedtia reticulata, now housed at the Royal Botanic Garden Edinburgh. She also supported the creation of a botanical section of the Sabah Museum.

Publications authored or coauthored by Phillipps include:

- A Guide to the Parks of Sabah (1988)
- Rhododendrons of Sabah (1988) (with A. Lamb, George Argent & Sheila Collenette)
- Pitcher-Plants of Borneo (1996) (with Anthony Lamb and Chien Lee)
- Kinabalu - Summit of Borneo (1996) (with K.M. Wong)
- Kinabalu Park, Sabah, Malaysian Borneo (2000) (with Francis Liew)
- The Rhododendrons of Sabah, Malaysian Borneo (2007) (with G. Argent & A. Lamb)

== Recognition ==
Phillipps has had a Philopotamidae caddisfly from the genus Gunungiella named after her.

== Personal life ==
Phillipps was brought up in Sabah, Malaysia. Phillipps lives in Kota Kinabalu, the capital of Sabah, and is married to Datuk Anthony Lamb (with two children, Serena and Alexander Lamb). A rainforest lodge in Sukau has been named for Phillipps and Lamb.
