= Mount Alab =

Mountain in Sabah, Malaysia

- Location within Malaysia

Highest point
- Elevation: 1,951 m (6,401 ft)
- Listing: Ribu
- Coordinates: 5°49′N 116°22′E

Naming
- Native name: Gunung Alab (Malay); Nulu Alab (Kadazan Dusun)

Geography
- Location: Penampang-Tambunan border, West Coast/Interior divisional boundary, Sabah
- Parent range: Crocker Mountains

Mount Alab (Malay: Gunung Alab, Dusun: Nulu Alab) is a mountain located at the border of the West Coast as well as the Interior divisions of Sabah, Malaysia. The mountain is located approximately 30 km (19 mi) from Sabah's capital, Kota Kinabalu, where it can be highly visible from the city on a clear sky and easily recognisable with the presence of telecommunications tower near its peak, approximately at 5°49′47″N 116°20′30″E. With a height of 1,951 metres (6,401 ft) to 2,050 metres (6,726 ft), it is the highest mountain within the Crocker Range in the Sabah Parks of Crocker Range National Park, which lies to the south of the highest peak on Borneo island, the Mount Kinabalu.

== Geology ==
The rock of the mountain consists of Late Eocene-Lower Miocene sedimentary rocks from Crocker Formation which is made of sandstone, shale and interlayered sandstone-siltstone-shale unit.
