= Pitcher-Plants of Borneo =

1996 book by Anthea Phillipps and Anthony Lamb

- Cover of first edition, showing N. clipeata
- Author: Anthea Phillipps, Anthony Lamb, Ch'ien Lee (2nd edition only)
- Language: English
- Publisher: Natural History Publications (Borneo)
- Publication date: 1996 (1st edition); 2008 (2nd edition)
- Media type: Print (hardcover)
- Pages: x + 171 (1st edition) viii + 298 (2nd edition)
- ISBN: 983812009X (1st edition); ISBN 9789838121262 (2nd edition)
- OCLC: 475093483

Pitcher-Plants of Borneo is a monograph by Anthea Phillipps and Anthony Lamb on the tropical pitcher plants of Borneo. It was first published in 1996 by Natural History Publications (Borneo), in association with the Royal Botanic Gardens, Kew and the Malaysian Nature Society. An updated and much expanded second edition was published in 2008 as Pitcher Plants of Borneo, with Ch'ien Lee as co-author.

== Content ==
The taxonomy presented in the first edition is based on that of Matthew Jebb and Martin Cheek's 1997 monograph, "A skeletal revision of Nepenthes (Nepenthaceae)", which was in preparation at the time of the book's publication. The second edition mostly follows the taxonomy of Cheek and Jebb's 2001 monograph, "Nepenthaceae". Both editions devote much space to the botanical and horticultural history of Nepenthes. In the first edition, the species accounts are predominantly illustrated with watercolour paintings by Susan M. Phillipps, while in the updated work they are supplemented by numerous habitat photographs by Ch'ien Lee. The first edition includes vernacular names for all species and natural hybrids; these were dropped in the updated version.

The first edition covers 32 species, 7 natural hybrids, and one undescribed taxon ("Nepenthes sp.", which has since been described as N. hurrelliana). The second edition includes 36 species, with the addition of N. chaniana, N. faizaliana, N. glandulifera, N. hispida, N. hurrelliana, N. platychila, and N. vogelii. Following the revisions made in "Nepenthaceae", a number of species included in the first edition are treated as synonyms in the 2008 book: N. borneensis as a synonym of N. boschiana and N. leptochila as a synonym of N. hirsuta. Nepenthes maxima is also dropped from the species list, as it is now considered absent from Borneo, with all similar plants from the island actually representing N. fusca. The 2008 book also synonymises N. zakriana with N. fusca and suggests that N. naquiyuddinii is a natural hybrid between N. fusca and N. reinwardtiana.

=== Species ===
The following 33 species, including one undescribed taxon, are covered in the first edition.

1. N. albomarginata
2. N. ampullaria
3. N. bicalcarata
4. N. borneensis
5. N. boschiana
6. N. burbidgeae
7. N. campanulata
8. N. clipeata
9. N. edwardsiana
10. N. ephippiata
11. N. fusca
12. N. gracilis
13. N. hirsuta
14. N. leptochila
15. N. lowii
16. N. macrophylla
17. N. macrovulgaris
18. N. mapuluensis
19. N. maxima
20. N. mirabilis
21. N. mollis
22. N. muluensis
23. N. murudensis
24. N. northiana
25. N. pilosa
26. N. rafflesiana
27. N. rajah
28. N. reinwardtiana
29. N. stenophylla
30. N. tentaculata
31. N. veitchii
32. N. villosa
33. N. sp. (N. hurrelliana)

The second edition includes accounts of 36 species.

1. N. albomarginata
2. N. ampullaria
3. N. bicalcarata
4. N. boschiana
5. N. burbidgeae
6. N. campanulata
7. N. chaniana
8. N. clipeata
9. N. edwardsiana
10. N. ephippiata
11. N. faizaliana
12. N. fusca
13. N. glandulifera
14. N. gracilis
15. N. hirsuta
16. N. hispida
17. N. hurrelliana
18. N. lowii
19. N. macrophylla
20. N. macrovulgaris
21. N. mapuluensis
22. N. mirabilis
23. N. mollis
24. N. muluensis
25. N. murudensis
26. N. northiana
27. N. pilosa
28. N. platychila
29. N. rafflesiana
30. N. rajah
31. N. reinwardtiana
32. N. stenophylla
33. N. tentaculata
34. N. veitchii
35. N. villosa
36. N. vogelii

== Reviews ==
Taxonomist Jan Schlauer reviewed Pitcher-Plants of Borneo in the June 1998 issue of the Carnivorous Plant Newsletter. He considered the work "a disappointment to all who expected an up-to-date review reflecting the present knowledge about the Bornean species of Nepenthes". However, Schlauer praised the watercolours, writing that most of them "give a quite accurate impression of the plants in the living condition (which must have been a particular challenge for the artist in those cases in which no living specimens were available, e.g. of the species from Kalimantan!)". Schlauer concludes by writing: "The book is a nice addition to the collection of any Nepenthes amateur bibliophile but it cannot be recommended for scientific purposes."

Reviewing the book for the June 1996 issue of the Bulletin of the Australian Carnivorous Plant Society, Tim Burfield wrote: "The authors have endeavoured to present a book which would be equally useful to beginners, experienced growers and general CP lovers and to that end they have struck a very good balance." Commenting on the retail price of $36, he opined that "the quality of the narrative, colour photographs and drawings make this cost justifiable".
