= Dendrobium lambii =

Scientific classification
- Kingdom: Plantae
- Clade: Tracheophytes
- Clade: Angiosperms
- Clade: Monocots
- Order: Asparagales
- Family: Orchidaceae
- Subfamily: Epidendroideae
- Genus: Dendrobium
- Species: D. lambii

Binomial name
- Dendrobium lambii J.J.Wood, 1983

Synonyms
- Distichorchis lambii (J.J.Wood) M.A.Clem., 2003

Species of orchid

Dendrobium lambii is an epiphytic orchid that is endemic to Borneo. It was described in 1983 by botanist Jeffrey James Wood. The specific epithet lambii honours British botanist Anthony Lamb.

== Taxonomy ==
The species is closely related to D. revolutum Lindl., which is widespread in Indochina and Malaya.

== Description ==
The species grows as an erect herb to 65 cm in height. The long-lasting, unscented flowers are initially white, shading to cinnamon and olive, before ageing to orange or pink.

== Distribution and habitat ==
The species was collected as an epiphyte upon Dacrydium in semi moss forest, on the Gunong Alab ridge on the crest of the Crocker Range in Sabah, Malaysia, at an elevation of 1,600–1,800 m.
