= Anthony Lamb =

Anthony Lamb may refer to:

- Anthony Lamb (basketball) (born 1998), American basketball player
- Anthony Lamb (botanist) (1937–2024), British botanist
- Tony Lamb (born 1939), Australian politician
