= Nepenthes laevis =

Nepenthes laevis may refer to:

- Nepenthes laevis Lindl. (1848) — synonym of N. gracilis
- Nepenthes laevis auct. non Lindl.: C.Morren (1852) — synonym of N. albomarginata
