= Nepenthes korthalsiana =

Nepenthes korthalsiana may refer to:

- Nepenthes korthalsiana Miq. (1858) — synonym of N. gracilis
- Nepenthes korthalsiana auct. non Miq.: Herb.Calc. ex Macfarl. (1908) — synonym of N. reinwardtiana
