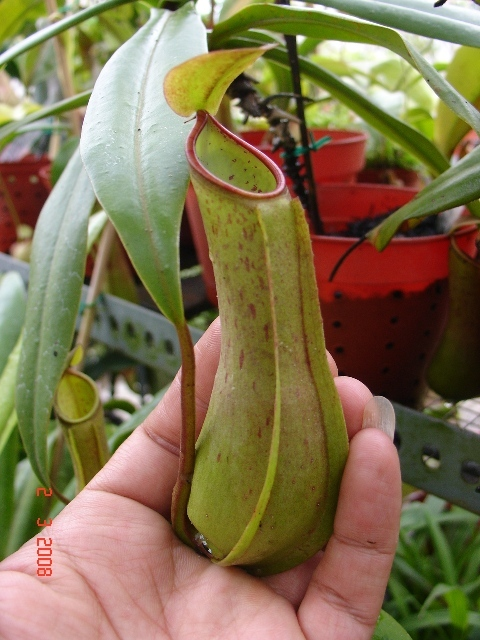
- Nepenthes × ferrugineomarginata, lower pitcher with red peristome

Scientific classification
- Kingdom: Plantae
- Clade: Tracheophytes
- Clade: Angiosperms
- Clade: Eudicots
- Order: Caryophyllales
- Family: Nepenthaceae
- Genus: Nepenthes
- Species: N. × ferrugineomarginata

Binomial name
- Nepenthes × ferrugineomarginata Sh.Kurata (1982) nom. inval.

Synonyms
- Nepenthes × ferrugineo-marginata Sh.Kurata (1982) nom. inval. [original spelling]

= Nepenthes × ferrugineomarginata =

Species of carnivorous plant

Nepenthes × ferrugineomarginata (/nɪˈpɛnθiːz fɛrʊˌdʒɪnioʊmɑːrdʒɪˈnɑːtə/; from Latin ferrugineus "rust coloured" and marginatus "margined") is a natural hybrid between N. albomarginata and N. reinwardtiana. It has been recorded from the islands of Borneo and Sumatra. The type specimen was collected by Shigeo Kurata in Kenukat, West Kalimantan, in 1981. Kurata described the hybrid the following year. The name is a nomen invalidum as it was published without a Latin description.

Nepenthes × ferrugineomarginata has the longest binomial name of any plant in the genus.

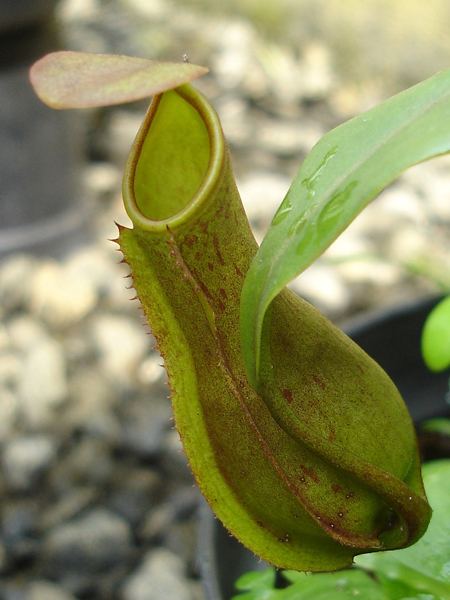
Lower pitcher with green peristome
