= Anthony Lamb (botanist) =

British botanist (1937–2024)

Datuk Anthony Lamb
- Born: 15 July 1937; British Ceylon (now Sri Lanka)
- Died: 31 January 2024 (aged 86); Kota Kinabalu, Sabah, Malaysia
- Education: University of Cambridge
- Spouse: Anthea Phillipps
- Children: 2
- Scientific career
- Fields: Plants of Borneo, especially orchids, rhododendrons
- Author abbrev. (botany): A.Lamb

Datuk Anthony L. Lamb, P.G.D.K. (15 July 1937 – 31 January 2024) was a British botanist, born in British Ceylon, who specialised in the flora of Sabah, East Malaysia, at the northern end of the island of Borneo.

== Early life ==
Lamb was educated in the United Kingdom, at Blundell's School in Tiverton and at St John's College at Cambridge. Lamb arrived in Sabah, then part of the British Crown Colony of North Borneo, in 1962 and started work on developing agricultural settlement schemes around Tawau.

== Career ==
In 1981, Lamb set up the Tenom Orchid Centre as a Sabah State Government conservation project. He is co-author of Rhododendrons of Sabah (1988) and Pitcher-Plants of Borneo (1996), and a coordinator and a co-author of the Orchids of Borneo series.

In 2015, Lamb was awarded a P.G.D.K. (Panglima Gemilang Darjah Kinabalu, in English: Commander of the Order of Kinabalu) by the Governor of Sabah, which carries the title of Datuk.

Lamb authored several volumes relating to the native orchids of Kinabalu Park, in Sabah, and Lamb described his life's work in an extensive 2004 interview, The Lost World of Sabah, in The Daily Telegraph.

A species of the orchid genus Dendrobium, found in Sabah and described in 1983, has been named Dendrobium lambii J.J.Wood in his honour. The New Zealand Native Group has recognized the work he has done over the years in 2016 for the Orchids of Borneo. Dipodium lambii O'Byrne was described in 2017 based on a collection by Lamb.

== Personal life and death ==
Lamb was married to Datin Anthea Phillipps, and they had two children. He died in Kota Kinabalu on 31 January 2024, at the age of 86.

== Selected publications ==
- The Rhododendrons of Sabah, Malaysian Borneo, George Argent, Anthony Lamb, Anthea Phillipps (2007)
- Pitcher Plants of Borneo, Anthea Phillipps, Anthony Lamb, Ch'ien C. Lee (2008)
- The Orchids of Mount Kinabalu, Jeffrey J. Wood, Teofila E. Beaman, Anthony Lamb, Chan Chew Lun, John H. Beaman, Reed S. Beaman, Rimi Repin, Jaap J. Vermeulen (2011)
- A Guide to Gingers of Borneo, Anthony Lamb (2013)
- Bulbophyllum of Borneo, Jaap Vermeulen, Peter O'Byrne, Anthony Lamb (2015)
- A Guide to Hoyas of Borneo, Anthony Lamb, Michele Rodda (2016)
- A Guide to Wild Fruits of Borneo, Anthony Lamb (2019)
- A Guide to Market Fruits of Borneo, Anthony Lamb (2022)
