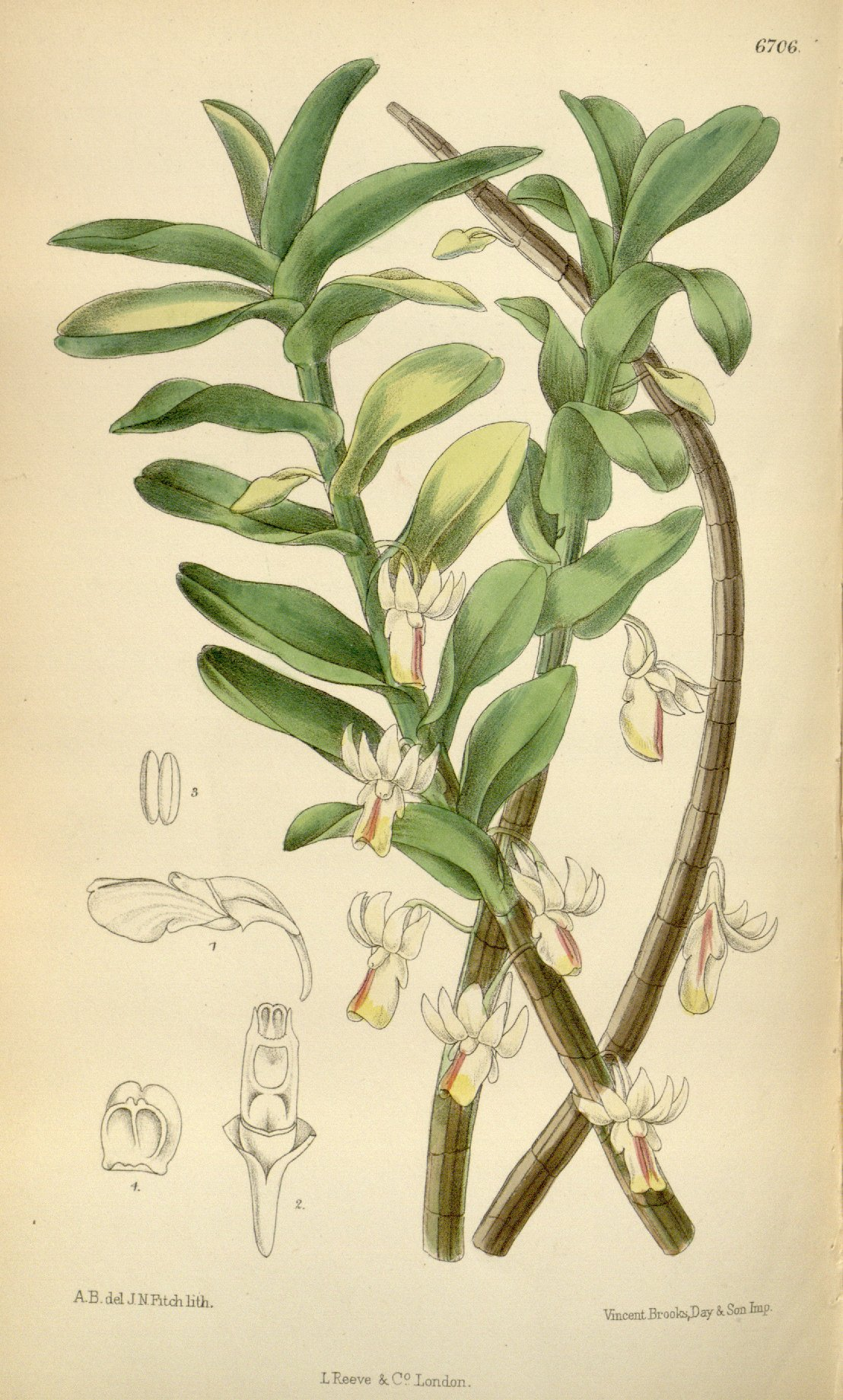
- 1882 illustration

Scientific classification
- Kingdom: Plantae
- Clade: Tracheophytes
- Clade: Angiosperms
- Clade: Monocots
- Order: Asparagales
- Family: Orchidaceae
- Subfamily: Epidendroideae
- Genus: Dendrobium
- Species: D. revolutum

Binomial name
- Dendrobium revolutum Lindl.

Synonyms
- Callista revoluta (Lindl.) Kuntze; Distichorchis revoluta (Lindl.) M.A.Clem.

= Dendrobium revolutum =

Species of orchid

Dendrobium revolutum is a species of flowering plant in the family Orchidaceae. It is native to Indochina (Laos, Thailand, Myanmar and Malaysia).
