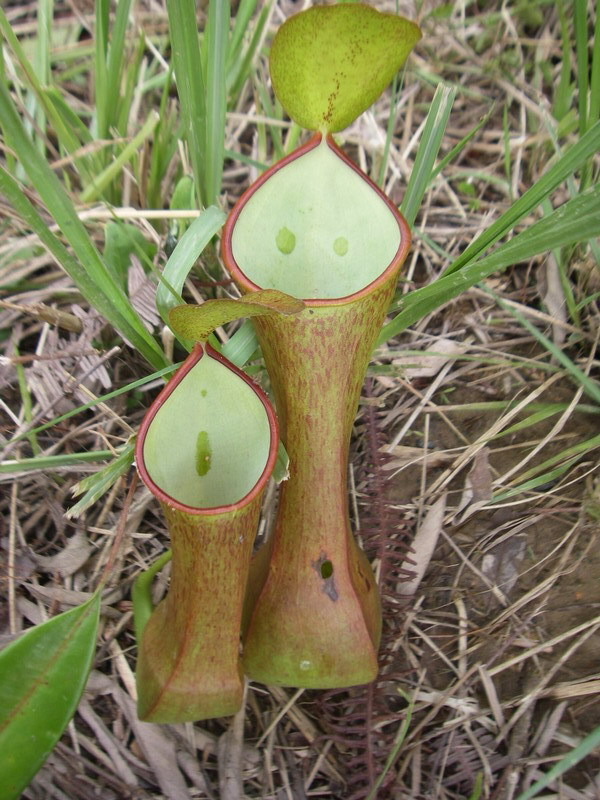
- Pitchers

Conservation status
- Least Concern (IUCN 3.1)

Scientific classification
- Kingdom: Plantae
- Clade: Embryophytes
- Clade: Tracheophytes
- Clade: Spermatophytes
- Clade: Angiosperms
- Clade: Eudicots
- Order: Caryophyllales
- Family: Nepenthaceae
- Genus: Nepenthes
- Species: N. reinwardtiana

Binomial name
- Nepenthes reinwardtiana Miq. (1852)

Synonyms
- Synonyms: Nepenthes korthalsiana auct. non Miq.: Herb.Calc. ex Macfarl. (1908); ?Nepenthes naquiyuddinii J.H.Adam & Hafiza (2006); Nepenthes reinwardtii Hook.f. (1859) sphalm.typogr.

= Nepenthes reinwardtiana =

Species of pitcher plant from Southeast Asia

Nepenthes reinwardtiana /nɪˈpɛnθiːz ˌraɪnwɔːrtiˈɑːnə/ is a tropical pitcher plant native to Borneo and Sumatra and to a number of smaller surrounding islands including Bangka, Natuna, Nias, and Siberut. Although some sources have included Peninsular Malaysia and Singapore within the range of this species, these records appear to be erroneous.

Nepenthes reinwardtiana has an unusually wide altitudinal distribution of 0–2,200 m, being both a "lowland" and "highland" plant. There are many different colour forms, ranging from green to dark red. This species is known for the two "eye spots" on the inside surface of its pitchers.

The specific epithet reinwardtiana honours Caspar Georg Carl Reinwardt. The species has been given the vernacular name Reinwardt's pitcher-plant.

== Taxonomy and Systematics ==
Upper pitchers of a plant identified as N. naquiyuddinii

=== Nepenthes naquiyuddinii ===
Nepenthes naquiyuddinii^{[note a]} /nɪˈpɛnθiːz ˌnækɪjʊˈdɪni.aɪ/ was described in 2006 by J. H. Adam and Hafiza A. Hamid. The taxon is only known from Keningau-Kimanis Road and the foot of Mount Trus Madi, both in Sabah, Borneo, where it grows at an elevation of 1,400 to 1,424 m in open secondary vegetation.

Although acknowledging close affinities between N. naquiyuddinii and N. reinwardtiana, Adam and Hafiza stated that the "two species exhibit many morphological differences and therefore they cannot be united into the same species". However, some authors consider these differences too small for species status and treat N. naquiyuddinii as a heterotypic synonym of N. reinwardtiana. Alternatively, N. naquiyuddinii may represent a natural hybrid involving N. fusca and N. reinwardtiana, the only species that are sympatric with it.

=== Phylogeny ===
In 2001, Charles Clarke performed a cladistic analysis of the Nepenthes species of Sumatra and Peninsular Malaysia using 70 morphological characteristics of each taxon. The following is a portion of the resultant cladogram, showing part of "Clade 6", which includes N. reinwardtiana.

- - unnamed
    - N. gracilis
    - N. reinwardtiana
  - unnamed
    - - N. tobaica
      - 79%
        - N. angasanensis
        - N. mikei

Modern molecular phylogenies, however, show that N. reinwardtiana is sister to Nepenthes macrovulgaris from Borneo. Their common ancestor seems to have diverged relatively early during the diversification of the genus. Unlike the morphology suggests, N. reinwardtiana is not closely related to Nepenthes gracilis, nor Nepenthes murudensis nor Nepenthes tobaica nor other Sumatran species.

== Intraspecific Taxa ==
- Nepenthes reinwardtiana var. samarindaensis J.H.Adam & Wilcock (1993)

== Natural Hybrids ==
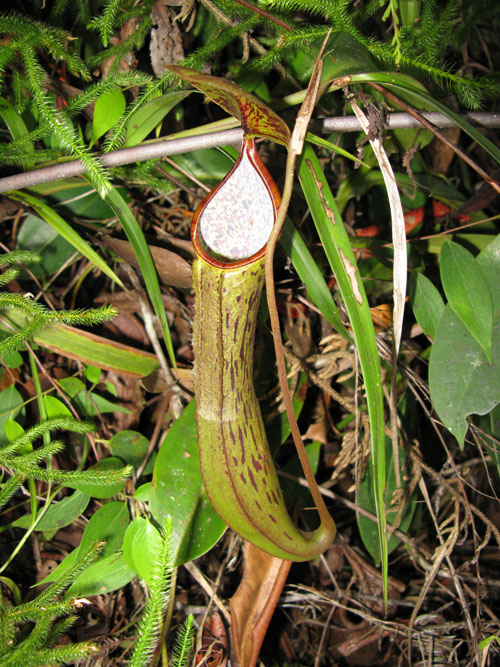
N. fusca × N. reinwardtiana

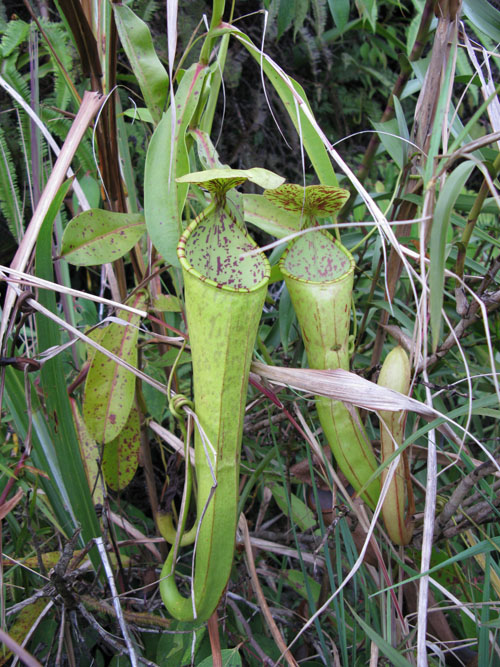
N. reinwardtiana × N. stenophylla

The following natural hybrids involving N. reinwardtiana have been recorded.

- N. albomarginata × N. reinwardtiana [=N. × ferrugineomarginata]
- N. ampullaria × N. reinwardtiana
- N. clipeata × N. reinwardtiana
- N. fusca × N. reinwardtiana [=?N. naquiyuddinii]
- N. gracilis × N. reinwardtiana
- N. gymnamphora × N. reinwardtiana
- N. hispida × N. reinwardtiana
- N. macrovulgaris × N. reinwardtiana
- N. mirabilis × N. reinwardtiana
- N. reinwardtiana × N. spathulata
- N. reinwardtiana × N. stenophylla
- N. reinwardtiana × N. tentaculata [=?N. murudensis]
- N. reinwardtiana × N. tobaica

== Notes ==
a. The species was named after the Universiti Kebangsaan Malaysia Pro-Chancellor, Yang Amat Mulia Tunku Laxamana Tunku Dato' Seri Utama Naquiyuddin Ibni Tuanku Ja'afar.
