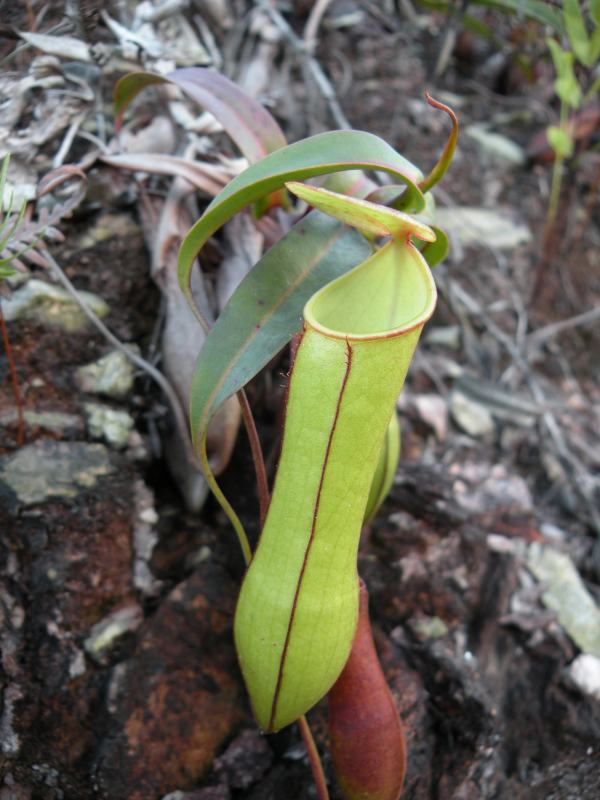
- A pitcher of Nepenthes gracilis from Terengganu, Peninsular Malaysia

Conservation status
- Least Concern (IUCN 3.1)

Scientific classification
- Kingdom: Plantae
- Clade: Embryophytes
- Clade: Tracheophytes
- Clade: Spermatophytes
- Clade: Angiosperms
- Clade: Eudicots
- Order: Caryophyllales
- Family: Nepenthaceae
- Genus: Nepenthes
- Species: N. gracilis

Binomial name
- Nepenthes gracilis Korth. (1839)

Synonyms
- Synonyms: Nepenthes angustifolia Mast. (1881); Nepenthes distillatoria auct. non L.: Jack (1835); Nepenthes distillatoria auct. non L.: Wall. (1828) [=N. distillatoria/N. gracilis]; Nepenthes korthalsiana Miq. (1858); Nepenthes laevis Lindl. (1848); Nepenthes laevis Korth. ex Hook.f. in DC. (1873); Nepenthes longinodis Beck (1895); Nepenthes obrieniana Linden & Rodigas (1890) nom.ambiguum [=?(N. gracilis × (N. rafflesiana × N. hirsuta)) × N. distillatoria/ N. gracilis/N. mirabilis]; Nepenthes teysmanniana Miq. (1858) [=N. albomarginata/N. gracilis]

= Nepenthes gracilis =

Species of pitcher plant from Southeast Asia

Nepenthes gracilis (/nɪˈpɛnθiːz ˈɡræsɪlɪs/; from Latin: gracilis "slender"), or the slender pitcher-plant, is a common lowland pitcher plant that is widespread in the Sunda region. It has been recorded from Borneo, Cambodia, Peninsular Malaysia, Singapore, Sulawesi, Sumatra, and Thailand. The species has a wide altitudinal distribution of 0 to 1,100 meters (and perhaps even 1,700 meters) above sea level, although most populations are found below 100 meters and plants are rare above 1,000 meters. Despite being a widespread plant, natural hybrids between N. gracilis and other species are quite rare.

Nepenthes gracilis was formally described by Pieter Willem Korthals in his 1839 monograph, "Over het geslacht Nepenthes".

Nepenthes abgracilis from the Philippines is named for its superficial similarity to this species.

== Carnivory ==
The small, elongated pitchers of N. gracilis appear relatively unremarkable and have a very thin peristome. Nevertheless, the species is unusual (and possibly unique) in that the underside of the pitcher lid bears an uneven layer of wax crystals. This layer is not as thick as, and structurally distinct from, that found in the waxy zone of the pitcher interior, and insects can easily adhere to it in dry conditions. During downpours, however, it functions as part of a trapping mechanism, whereby the impact of raindrops striking the lid causes insects to lose their footing and fall into the pitcher cup below.

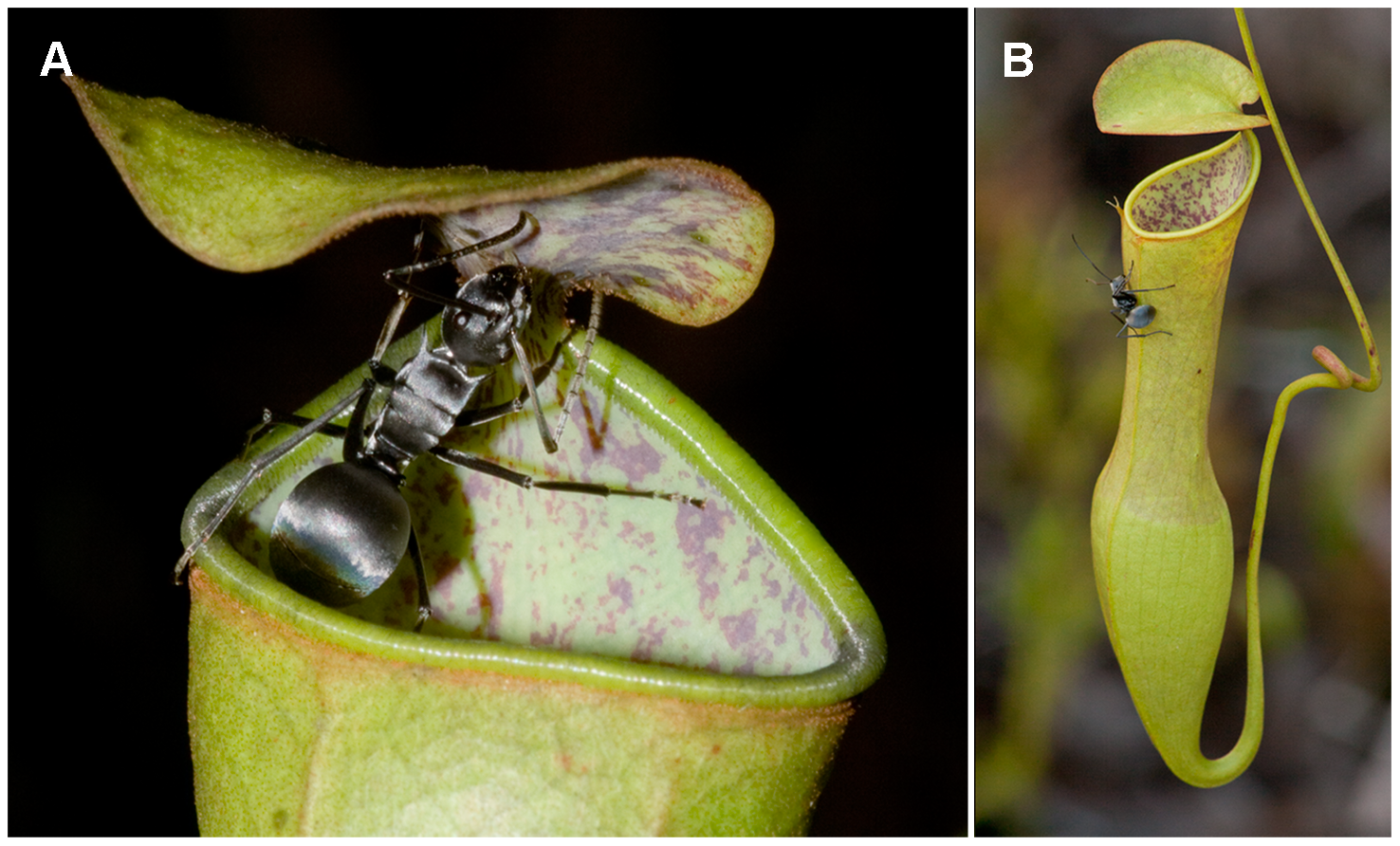
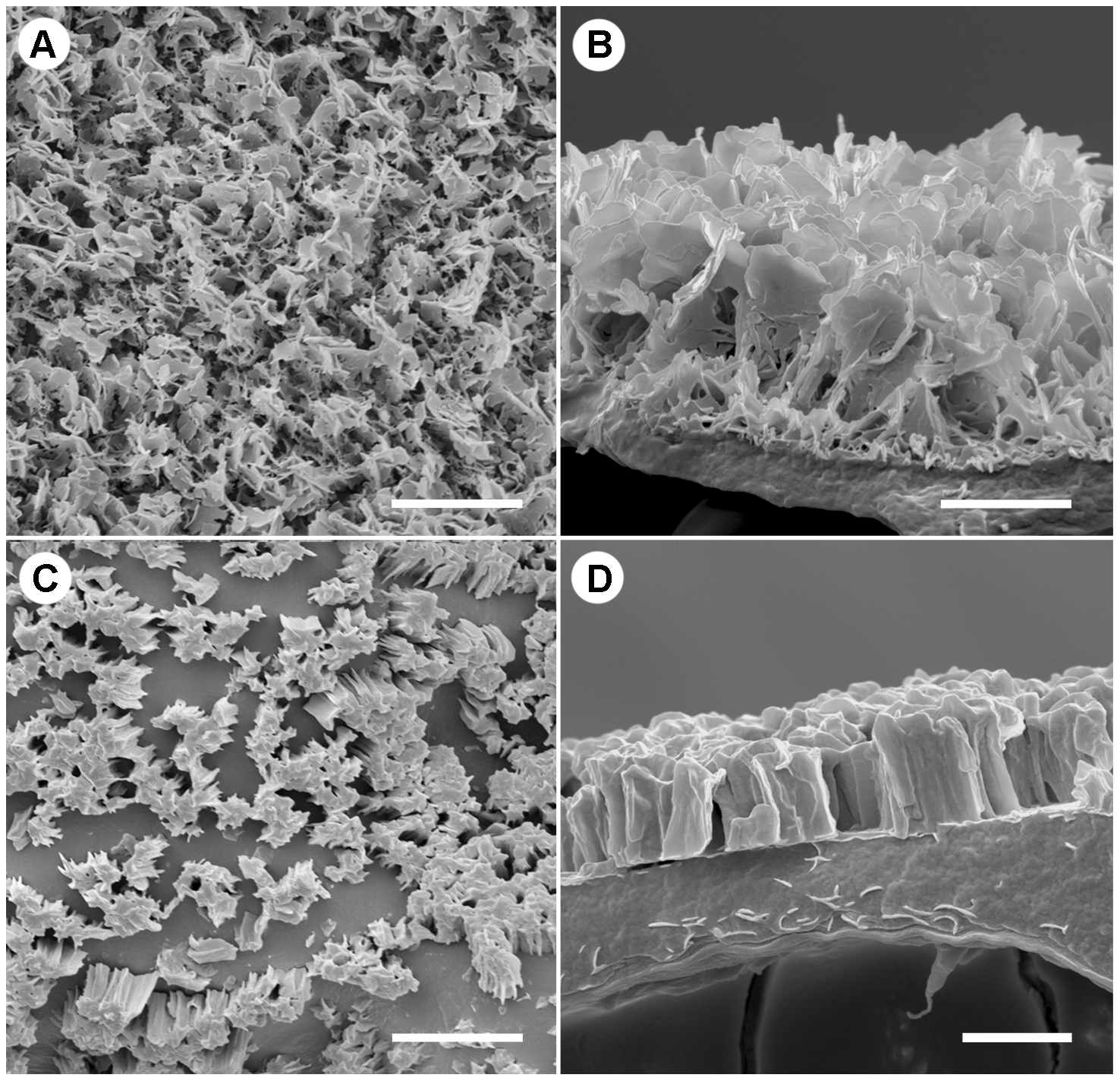
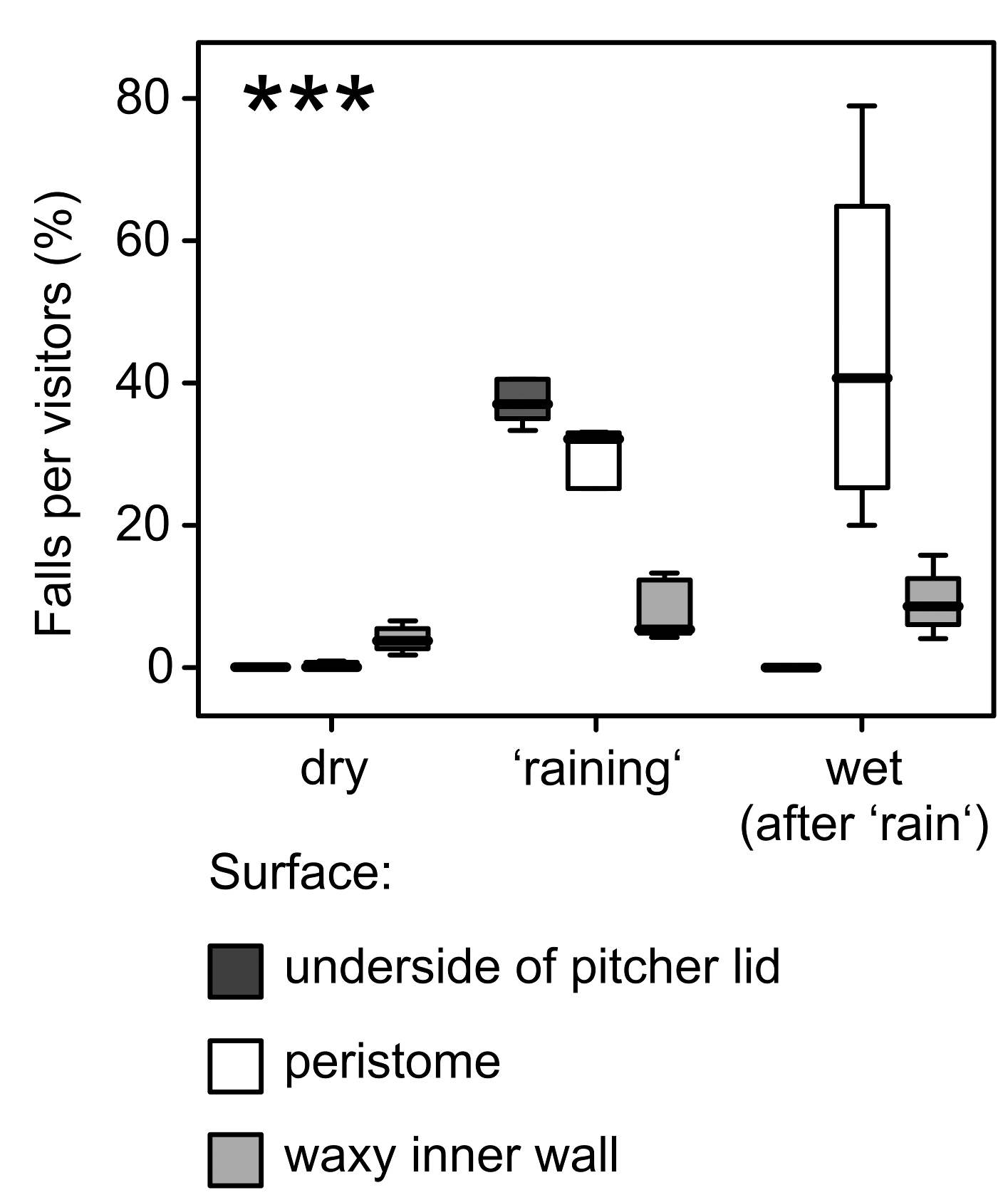
Left: Nepenthes gracilis upper pitcher with a Polyrhachis pruinosa ant (A and B), showing the waxy zones of the pitcher interior and lower lid surface.

Centre: Scanning electron micrographs revealing the ultrastructure of N. gracilis wax crystals on the inner surface of the pitcher (A and B) and underside of the lid (C and D).

Right: Prey capture efficiency of the two waxy layers and peristome of N. gracilis under 'dry', 'raining' and 'wet' conditions.
Trapping function of N. gracilis pitcher lid under experimental conditions
Ants being flicked off the waxy lower surface of the lid by the action of simulated rain

The same experiment carried out with an isolated lid held in place with a paper clip

High-speed recording showing a house fly (Musca domestica) falling into a pitcher following raindrop impact (recording frame rate: 428 s^{−1}, playback frame rate: 10 s^{−1})

== Distribution ==
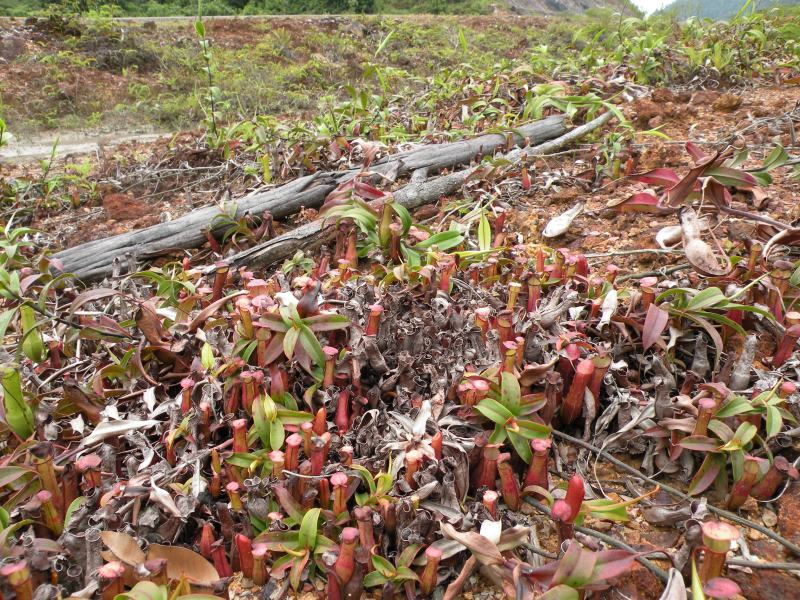
Nepenthes gracilis habitat in Pahang, Peninsular Malaysia

One of the most widespread Nepenthes species, N. gracilis is native to Borneo, Cambodia, Peninsular Malaysia, Singapore, Sumatra, central Sulawesi, and southernmost Thailand. It has also been recorded from many smaller islands, including Bangka, Batu Islands, Belitung, Bengkalis, Ko Lanta, Ko Tarutao, Labuan, Langkawi, Mendol, Mentawai Islands (Siberut), Meranti Islands (Padang, Rangsang, and Tebing Tinggi), Musala, Nias, Penang, Phuket, Riau Islands (Lingga Islands, Natuna Islands, and Riau Archipelago), and Rupat.

== Evolutionary origins ==
In 2001, Charles Clarke performed a cladistic analysis of the Nepenthes species of Sumatra and Peninsular Malaysia using 70 morphological characteristics of each taxon; this analysis found that N. gracilis is sister to N. reinwardtiana, and that this clade is in turn sister to a clade containing N. tobaica, N. angasanensis, and N. mikei.

However, when genetic data instead of morphological characters are used to perform similar analyses, it becomes evident that N. gracilis is not closely related to any of these 4 species. Rather, N. gracilis is the sister group to the other members of a "N. mirabilis group": N. bicalcarata, a group of species around N. tomoriana (several species from Sulawesi, Papua and New Caledonia), N. ampullaria, N. mirabilis and N. rafflesiana sensu lato.

The contrast between molecular and morphological phylogenies implies that the morphological characters evolved quite fast and repeatedly, and do not necessarily reflect shared ancestry of the species.

== Infraspecific taxa ==
Despite varying little across its range, N. gracilis has a number of infraspecific taxa. Most of these are no longer considered valid.

- Nepenthes gracilis f. angustifolia (Mast.) Hort.Westphal (1993)
- Nepenthes gracilis var. angustifolia (Mast.) Hort.Weiner in sched. (1985)
- Nepenthes gracilis var. arenaria Ridl. ex Macfarl. (1908)
- Nepenthes gracilis var. elongata Blume (1852)
- Nepenthes gracilis var. longinodis Beck (1895)
- Nepenthes gracilis var. major Hort.Van Houtte ex Rafarin (1869)
- Nepenthes gracilis var. teysmanniana (Miq.) Beck (1895)

== Natural hybrids ==
The following natural hybrids involving N. gracilis have been recorded.

- N. albomarginata × N. gracilis
- N. ampullaria × N. gracilis [=N. × trichocarpa]
- (N. ampullaria × N. gracilis) × N. bicalcarata [=N. × trichocarpa × N. bicalcarata]
- N. bicalcarata × N. gracilis [=N. × cantleyi]
- ? N. eustachya × N. gracilis
- N. gracilis × N. mirabilis [=N. × sharifah-hapsahii, N. × ghazallyana, N. × grabilis, N. neglecta?]
- N. gracilis × N. northiana [=N. × bauensis]
- N. gracilis × N. rafflesiana
- N. gracilis × N. reinwardtiana
- N. gracilis × N. sumatrana
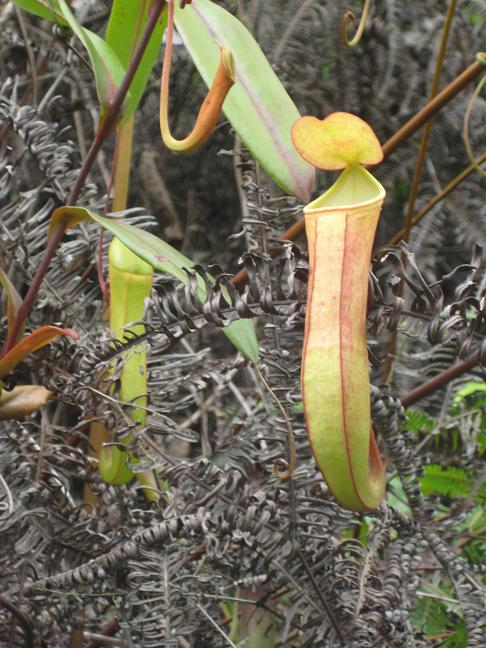
N. albomarginata × N. gracilis

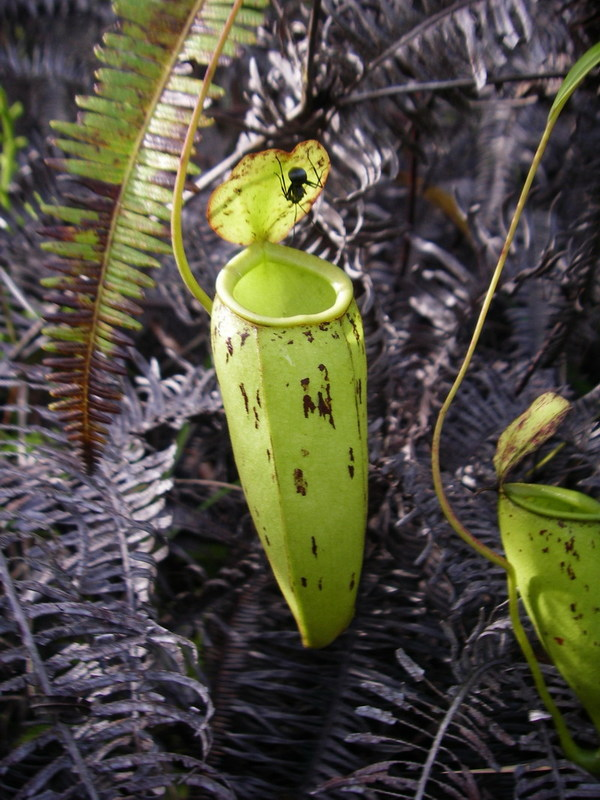
N. ampullaria × N. gracilis

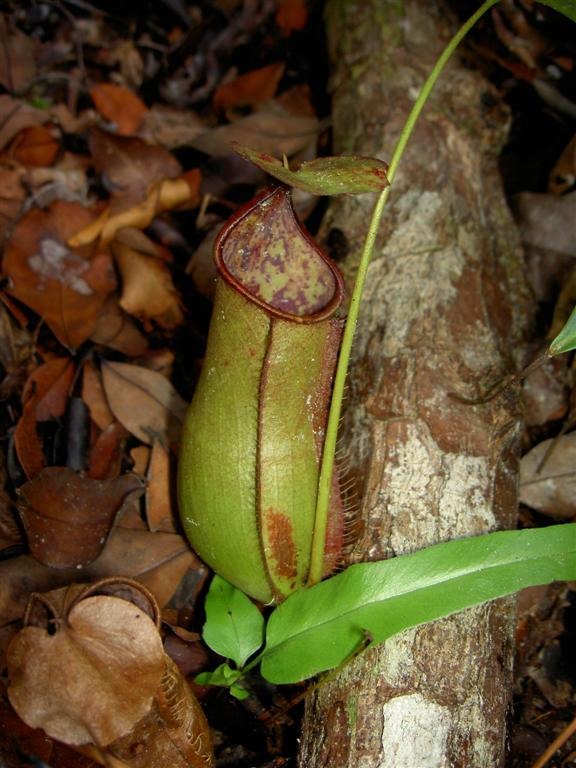
N. bicalcarata × N. gracilis

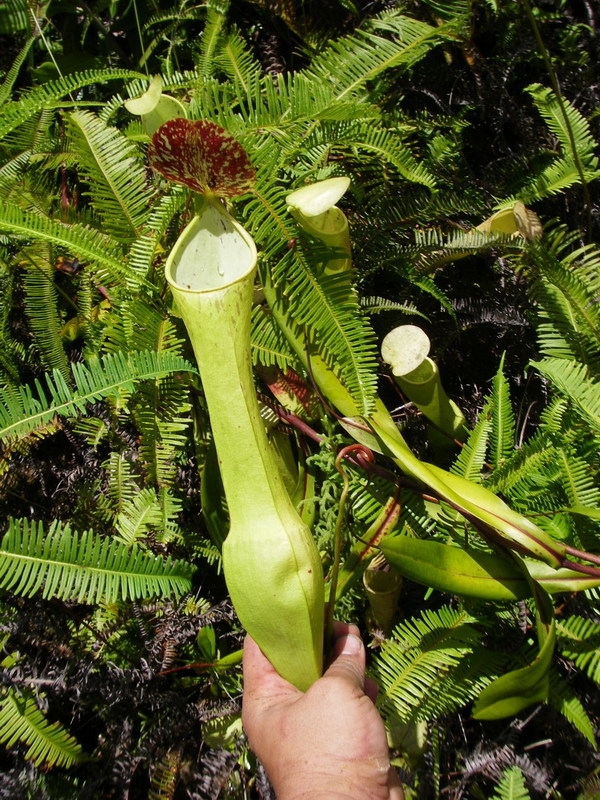
? N. eustachya × N. gracilis

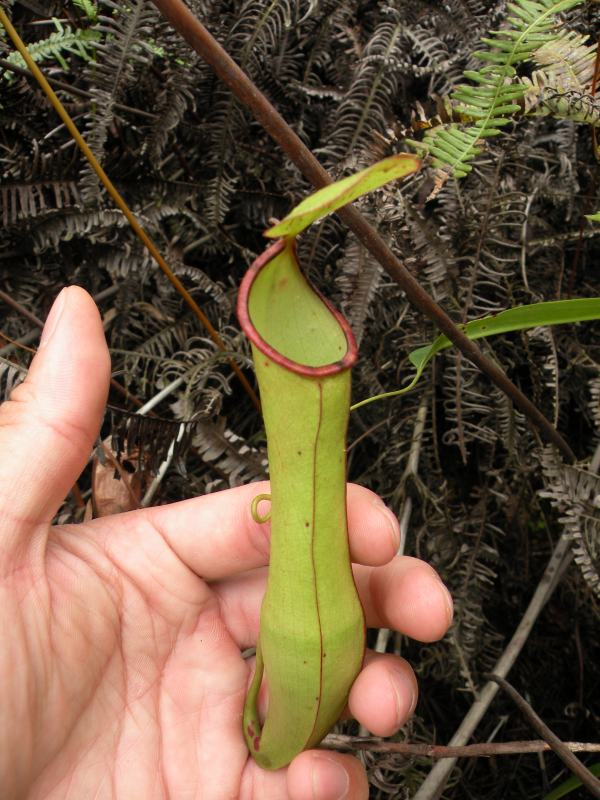
N. gracilis × N. mirabilis

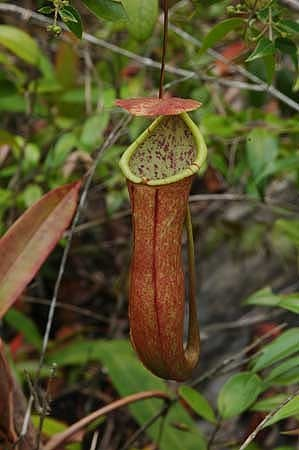
N. gracilis × N. northiana

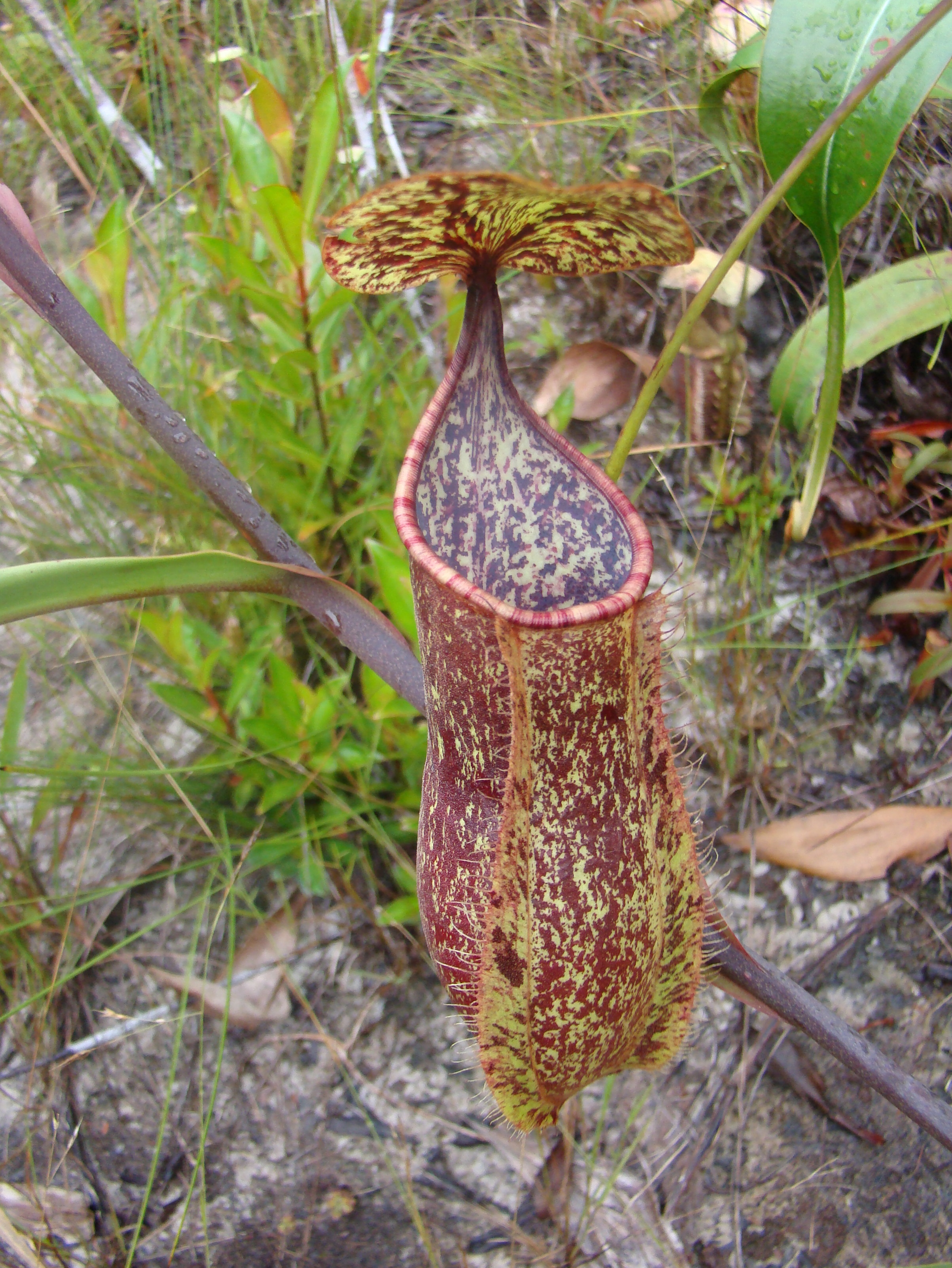
N. gracilis × N. rafflesiana

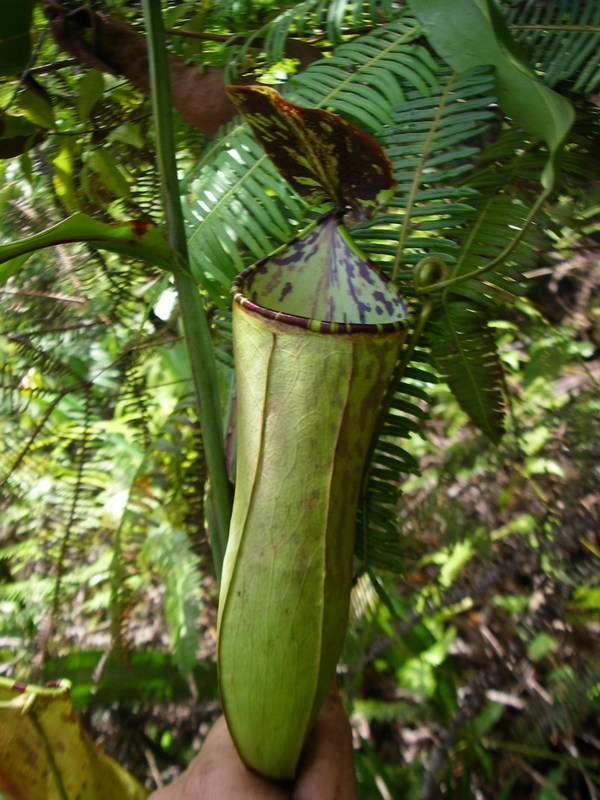
N. gracilis × N. sumatrana
