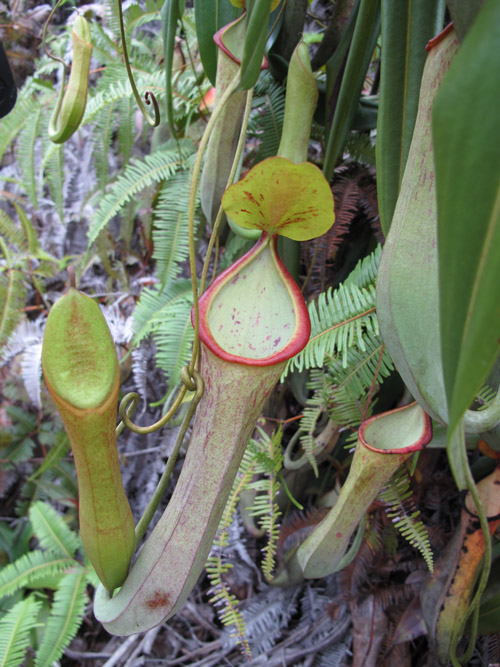
- Aerial traps of a narrow-pitchered form of N. macrovulgaris growing at 100–150 m above sea level in Sabah, Borneo

Conservation status
- Least Concern (IUCN 3.1)

Scientific classification
- Kingdom: Plantae
- Clade: Tracheophytes
- Clade: Angiosperms
- Clade: Eudicots
- Order: Caryophyllales
- Family: Nepenthaceae
- Genus: Nepenthes
- Species: N. macrovulgaris

Binomial name
- Nepenthes macrovulgaris J.R.Turnbull & A.T.Middleton (1988)

Synonyms
- Nepenthes sp. Sh.Kurata (1976)

= Nepenthes macrovulgaris =

Tropical pitcher plant endemic to Borneo

Nepenthes macrovulgaris (/nɪˈpɛnθiːz ˌmækroʊvʌlˈɡɛərɪs/; from Greek macro- "large" and Latin vulgaris "common, usual"), or the serpentine pitcher-plant, is a tropical pitcher plant endemic to Borneo. It is a lowland plant that typically grows at altitudes ranging from 300 to 1,200 m in sub-montane forest clearings and mossy forest. Its range is restricted to ultramafic habitats, including Mount Kinabalu, Mount Tambuyukon, the Danum Valley, the Tawai Range, the Meliau Range and Mount Silam, all in Sabah, Malaysian Borneo. Pitchers grow to around 25 cm high and range in colour from green to brown, with the speckled form being the most common.

== Taxonomy and Phylogeny ==
Before modern molecular phylogenies, it was thought that Nepenthes macrovulgaris is most closely related to N. hirsuta and N. hispida, and may have been difficult to distinguish from them. Botanists Matthew Jebb and Martin Cheek suggest that N. macrovulgaris is also related to N. philippinensis, a species endemic to Palawan in the Philippines.

Morphological differences between N. macrovulgaris, N. hirsuta and N. hispida (Steiner, 2002 after Clarke, 1997)
N. macrovulgaris	N. hirsuta	N. hispida
leaves charteous ≤30 cm, oblong to linear	leaves coriaceous ≤20 cm, canaliculate-spathulate or obovate	leaves coriaceous sessile ≤28 cm, oblanceolate-oblongate
apex acute to obtuse	apex acute or roundish	apex acuminate-obtuse, often unequal
base attenuate into a winged petiole, wings wider towards the base, clasping stem for about half its diameter, not decurrent	base attenuate, forming laterally flattened, semi-amplexicaul sheath	base attenuate, amplexicaul and often decurrent onto the internode
longitudinal veins: 2-3 on each side	longitudinal veins not prominent	longitudinal veins: 3 on each side
adult pitchers and stem glabrous, young pitchers with short, thin hairs	stem densely covered with long brown hairs, not as bristle-like as those of N. hispida	stem very densely covered with bristle-like purple-grey hairs

Molecular phylogenies, however, show that N. macrovulgaris is in fact sister to Nepenthes reinwardtiana, and it is not a close relative of Nepenthes hispida and Nepenthes hirsuta, nor close to Nepenthes philippinensis. The striking similarity in morphology and habitat preference between N. macrovulgaris and Nepenthes philippinensis could be because they represent an ancestral phenotype, or parallel/convergent evolution.

== Etymology ==
Turnbull and Middleton, who described the species in 1988, explain that they chose the specific epithet macrovulgaris to:

[...] indicate a relatively large plant and to indicate that no single characteristic uniquely distinguishes this taxon from all others. The suffix vulgaris does not indicate that this species is either common or ordinary. On the contrary, it is quite striking. The epithet is an irregular combination of Greek and Latin. The name was used in the field to identify living material which was distributed to growers and this informal name is now commonly used by collectors. We feel that to change the name now would create unnecessary confusion.

== Natural hybrids ==
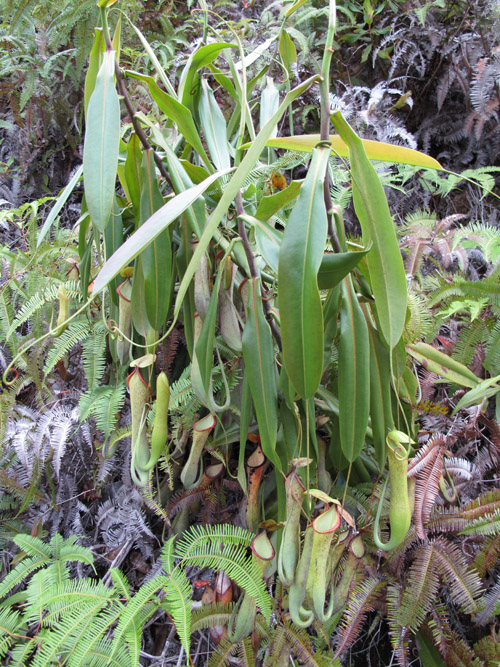
Climbing stems of N. macrovulgaris

The following natural hybrids involving N. macrovulgaris have been recorded.

- N. albomarginata × N. macrovulgaris
- N. macrovulgaris × N. rajah
- N. macrovulgaris × N. reinwardtiana
- N. macrovulgaris × N. tentaculata
