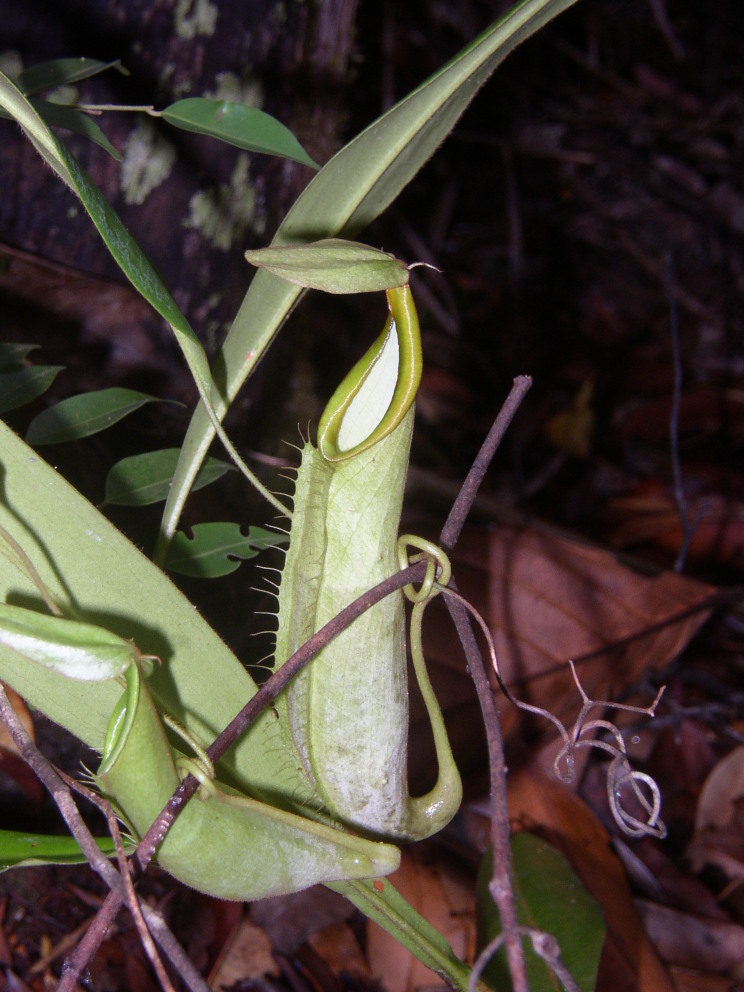
- Upper pitchers of N. hirsuta. Bako National Park, Borneo.

Conservation status
- Least Concern (IUCN 3.1)

Scientific classification
- Kingdom: Plantae
- Clade: Embryophytes
- Clade: Tracheophytes
- Clade: Spermatophytes
- Clade: Angiosperms
- Clade: Eudicots
- Order: Caryophyllales
- Family: Nepenthaceae
- Genus: Nepenthes
- Species: N. hirsuta

Binomial name
- Nepenthes hirsuta Hook.f. (1873)

Synonyms
- Nepenthes leptochila Danser (1928)

= Nepenthes hirsuta =

Species of pitcher plant from Borneo

Nepenthes hirsuta (/nɪˈpɛnθiːz hərˈsjuːtə/; from Latin: hirsūtus "hairy, bristly"), the hairy pitcher-plant, is a tropical pitcher plant endemic to Borneo. It is characterised by an indumentum of thick brown hairs, which is even present on the inflorescence. Pitchers are mostly green throughout with some having red blotches on the inside surfaces.

N. hirsuta grows at an elevation of 200–1,100 m. It is present in a wide range of habitats, including kerangas forest, mossy banks in lower montane forest, open areas, and disturbed vegetation on lower ridges. It grows mostly on sandstone substrates.

== Taxonomy ==
N. hirsuta is most closely related to N. hispida and N. macrovulgaris. Botanists Matthew Jebb and Martin Cheek suggest that N. hirsuta is also related to N. philippinensis, a species endemic to Palawan in the Philippines.

Morphological differences between N. macrovulgaris, N. hirsuta and N. hispida (Steiner, 2002 after Clarke, 1997)
N. macrovulgaris	N. hirsuta	N. hispida
leaves charteous ≤30 cm, oblong to linear	leaves coriaceous ≤20 cm, canaliculate-spathulate or obovate	leaves coriaceous sessile ≤28 cm, oblanceolate-oblongate
apex acute to obtuse	apex acute or roundish	apex acuminate-obtuse, often unequal
base attenuate into a winged petiole, wings wider towards the base, clasping stem for about half its diameter, not decurrent	base attenuate, forming laterally flattened, semi-amplexicaul sheath	base attenuate, amplexicaul and often decurrent onto the internode
longitudinal veins: 2-3 on each side	longitudinal veins not prominent	longitudinal veins: 3 on each side
adult pitchers and stem glabrous, young pitchers with short, thin hairs	stem densely covered with long brown hairs, not as bristle-like as those of N. hispida	stem very densely covered with bristle-like purple-grey hairs

In his Carnivorous Plant Database, taxonomist Jan Schlauer treats N. hispida as a heterotypic synonym of N. hirsuta.

Herbarium specimens of N. hirsuta

== Infraspecific taxa ==
- Nepenthes hirsuta var. glabrata Macfarl. (1908)
- Nepenthes hirsuta var. glabrescens W.G.Sm. (1882) [=N. distillatoria]
- Nepenthes hirsuta var. glabrescens rubra auct. non Hort. ex Rafarin: Nichols. (1892) [=N. distillatoria]
- Nepenthes hirsuta var. typica Macfarl. (1908) nom.illeg.

== Natural hybrids ==
The following natural hybrids involving N. hirsuta have been recorded.

- N. albomarginata × N. hirsuta
- N. ampullaria × N. hirsuta
- ? N. hirsuta × N. lowii
