= List of Nepenthes literature =

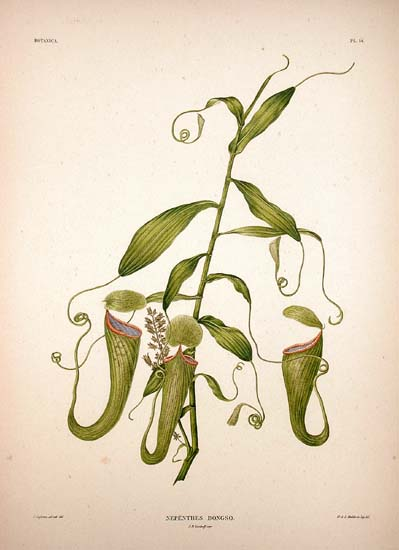
A hand-coloured lithograph of N. bongso from Pieter Willem Korthals's "Over het geslacht Nepenthes" of 1839, generally regarded as the first monograph on the genus.

This list of Nepenthes literature is a listing of major published works dealing with the tropical pitcher plants of the genus Nepenthes. It includes specialised standalone publications and taxonomic monographs released as part of larger works, but excludes regular journal and magazine articles.

Unless otherwise indicated, all information on individual publications is sourced from them directly. Works are listed chronologically by year of first publication.

== Standalone publications ==
This list includes all works published as standalone books or booklets, with the exception of children's literature, which is listed separately below.

Name	Author(s)	Year	Language	Publisher	Pages	Additional information	Reviews
History of Nepenthes (ウツボカヅラの歴史, Utsubokadzura no rekishi)	Isamu Kusakabe	1961	Japanese	Insectivorous Plant Society	54	special issue no. 3 of the Journal of Insectivorous Plant Society	
Nepenthes of Mount Kinabalu	Shigeo Kurata	1976	English	Sabah National Parks Trustees	80	significantly contributed to popular interest in Nepenthes	see article
The Pitcher Plant: Nepenthes khasiana	Renu Prova Momin Bordoloi	1977	English	Dutta Baruah	59	part of the Carnivorous Plants of North East India series; 5 pages of plates not included in page count	
Pitcher Plants of Peninsular Malaysia & Singapore	Roger Shivas	1984	English	Maruzen Asia	xii + 58	24 pages of plates not included in page count	"It was the author's intention to make this book serve as a field guide and he succeeded in this by giving us good closeup pictures of upper, lower and sometimes intermediate pitchers of all 12 species that are described. Although the book is small, and ideal for field use, it does not lack any of the essential information that one needs to use in finding these plants and admiring them."
The Grief Vanishing – Nepenthes (無憂草 – Nepenthes, Muyū kusa – Nepenthes)	Tetsuya Oikawa	1992	Japanese	Parco Co.	66	part of the Jungle Books series	"1 to 9 photos of each mentioned species, information on morphology and functions of Nepenthes. The photos are so beautiful that at least Nepenthes enthusiasts should have this book."
Pitcher-Plants of Borneo	Anthea Phillipps & Anthony Lamb	1996	English	Natural History Publications (Borneo)	x + 171	strongly focused on botanical and horticultural history; mainly illustrated with watercolour paintings by Susan M. Phillipps	see article
Nepenthes of Borneo	Charles Clarke	1997, 2006 (reprint)	English	Natural History Publications (Borneo)	xii + 207	ecological and taxonomic monograph	see article
Nepenthes of Sumatra and Peninsular Malaysia	Charles Clarke	2001	English	Natural History Publications (Borneo)	x + 326	ecological and taxonomic monograph; 1 new species described	see article
A Guide to the Pitcher Plants of Sabah	Charles Clarke	2001	English	Natural History Publications (Borneo)	iv + 40	field guide	"The photos are simply incredible, and the book covers important information such as natural habitats. Indeed, it is somewhat like a condensed version of "Nepenthes of Borneo", but rewritten in less scientific language."
A Guide to the Pitcher Plants of Peninsular Malaysia	Charles Clarke	2002	English	Natural History Publications (Borneo)	iv + 32	field guide	"As usual for one of Clarke's books, the text is concise, well written and accurate. But overshadowing the text is the photography, which is truly beautiful as well as illustrative of the essential characters of each species and hybrid."
Borneo: Its Mountains and Lowlands with their Pitcher Plants	Hugo Steiner	2002	English	Toihaan Publishing Company	viii + 136	mainly illustrated with photographs taken by the author between 1992 and 2002	"People looking for an interesting but not too technical or scientific work on Borneo and its pitcher plants would especially benefit from this book. [...] The aesthetic aspect remains very good despite two or three low quality photographs [...]"
Pitcher Plants of Sarawak	Charles Clarke & Ch'ien Lee	2004	English	Natural History Publications (Borneo)	vi + 81	pocket field guide; mainly illustrated with photographs by Ch'ien Lee	"This is a wonderful introduction to the species that grow in this area and is in full colour. With an introduction to Nepenthes, the 25 species plus an environmental examination it whets your appetite to want to visit this area or at least grow the plants." "As usual with Clarke's books, the photographs are excellent."
The Nepenthaceae of the Netherlands Indies	B. H. Danser	2006	English	Natural History Publications (Borneo)	vi + 206	reprint of the 1928 monograph; includes 15-page introduction by Charles Clarke	see article
A Field Guide to the Nepenthes of Sumatra	Hernawati & Pitra Akhriadi	2006	English	PILI-NGO Movement	xiv + 94	field guide; result of research program funded by BP	"[...] a short book presenting basic information on thirty-one Sumatran taxa [...] The quality of the paper, printing and images is perhaps a little low, but given the very meagre funds available to produce this book, this is understandable."
Nepenthes: Kantong Semar Yang Unik	Muhammad Mansur	2006	Indonesian	Penebar Swadaya	iv + 100		
Petunjuk Praktis Perawatan Nepenthes	Frankie Handoyo & Maloedyn Sitanggang	2006	Indonesian	AgroMedia Pustaka	vi + 66	cultivation guide	
Trubus Info Kit: Nepenthes	Onny Untung (chief editor)	2006	Indonesian	PT Trubus Swadaya	iv + 284	strongly focused on cultivation; English e-book also available	
Budi Daya Ex-Situ Nepenthes: Kantong Semar nan Eksotis	Arie Wijayani Purwanto	2007	Indonesian	Kanisius	60	cultivation guide	
Sukses Bertanam Kantong Semar	S. Wulandari	2007	Indonesian	Sinar Cemerlang Abadi	vi + 58	cultivation guide	
Entuyut (Nepenthes) asal Kalimantan Barat	Agustina Listiawati & Chairani Siregar	2008	Indonesian	Untan Press	88	government publication	
Pitcher Plants of Borneo, Second Edition	Anthea Phillipps, Anthony Lamb & Ch'ien Lee	2008	English	Natural History Publications (Borneo)	viii + 298	much expanded second edition; strongly focused on botanical and horticultural history; includes many photographs by Ch'ien Lee	see article
ร้อยพรรณพฤกษา ไม้กินแมลง หม้อข้าวหม้อแกงลิง	Suwarun Suphawut	2009^{[a]}	Thai	เศรษฐศิลป์	112	strongly focused on cultivation and horticultural hybrids	
Pitcher Plants of the Old World (2 volumes)	Stewart McPherson	2009	English	Redfern Natural History Productions	xvi + 1399	also covers Cephalotus follicularis; 1 new species described	see article
The Malaysian Nepenthes: Evolutionary and Taxonomic Perspectives	Chris Thorogood	2010	English	Nova Science Publishers	vi + 158	part of the Botanical Research and Practices Series	
Nepenthes della Thailandia: Diario di viaggio	Marcello Catalano	2010	Italian	self-published	207	travel diary; 4 new species described	"In a narrative style that only Italians master (“se non è vero, è ben trovato”), the author describes his remarkable experience from roughly a decade of training and research both at herbaria and in the field. [...] The diversity of the genus in Thailand as featured in the present book is far greater than expressed by any previous author."
Field Guide to the Pitcher Plants of the Philippines	Stewart McPherson & Victor B. Amoroso	2011	English	Redfern Natural History Productions	61	field guide	
New Nepenthes: Volume One	Stewart McPherson	2011	English	Redfern Natural History Productions	xiv + 595	7 new species described; includes accounts of new discoveries since 2009 publication of Pitcher Plants of the Old World	
Field Guide to the Pitcher Plants of Sulawesi	Stewart McPherson & Alastair Robinson	2012	English	Redfern Natural History Productions	49	field guide	
Field Guide to the Pitcher Plants of Borneo	Stewart McPherson & Alastair Robinson	2012	English	Redfern Natural History Productions	101	field guide	
Field Guide to the Pitcher Plants of Australia and New Guinea	Stewart McPherson & Alastair Robinson	2012	English	Redfern Natural History Productions	59	field guide	
Field Guide to the Pitcher Plants of Peninsular Malaysia and Indochina	Stewart McPherson & Alastair Robinson	2012	English	Redfern Natural History Productions	59	field guide	
Field Guide to the Pitcher Plants of Sumatra and Java	Stewart McPherson & Alastair Robinson	2012	English	Redfern Natural History Productions	91	field guide	
Kantong Semar Mirabilis (Nepenthes mirabilis Druce) dan Teknik Budidayanya	Tri Handayani, Yupi Isnaini & Yuzammi	2012	Indonesian	Pusat Konservasi Tumbuhan Kebun Raya Bogor - LIPI	iii + 77	part of the Pendayagunaan Tumbuhan Berpotensi series (no. 1)	
Mengenal Kantong Semar Adrianii	Tri Handayani, Hartutiningsih-M. Siregar, Melani Kurnia Rismawati & Hary Wawangningrum	2012	Indonesian	Pusat Konservasi Tumbuhan Kebun Raya Bogor - LIPI	v + 54	part of the Pendayagunaan Tumbuhan Berpotensi series (no. 4)	

== Monographs published as part of larger works ==
This list includes major monographs that were not released as standalone publications. In the case of journal articles and papers, the parent publication is indicated in brackets.

Only the primary prosaic language is listed for each publication, although many of the earlier monographs also include substantial portions of Latin text in the form of taxon descriptions. Some of the taxa formally described in these monographs are not considered taxonomically valid today.

Name	Author(s)	Year	Language	Format	Pages	Additional information	Reviews
"Over het geslacht Nepenthes"	Pieter Willem Korthals	1839	Dutch	part of Verhandelingen over de Natuurlijke Geschiedenis der Nederlandsche overzeesche bezittingen	44	generally regarded as the first monograph on Nepenthes; 3 new species described	
"Über die Gattung Nepenthes besonders in Rücksicht auf ihre physiologische Eigenthümlichkeit"	Ernst Wunschmann	1872	German	doctoral thesis (Friedrich-Wilhelms-Universität Berlin); published by Buchdruckerei von Gustav Schade (Otto Francke)	50	sometimes considered the first monograph on Nepenthes	
"Nepenthaceae"	Joseph Dalton Hooker	1873	Latin	part of the seventeenth volume of Prodromus Systematis Naturalis Regni Vegetabilis	16	7 new species described; primarily focused on new discoveries from northern Borneo	
"Die Gattung Nepenthes"	Günther Beck von Mannagetta und Lerchenau	1895	German	journal article (Wiener Illustrirte Garten-Zeitung)	46	published in 4 parts; 4 new species described; 1 new species combination	
"Nepenthaceae"	John Muirhead Macfarlane	1908	English	part of Das Pflanzenreich	91	8 new species described; includes detailed accounts of structure, anatomy, and development	see article
"The Nepenthaceae of the Netherlands Indies"	B. H. Danser	1928	English	journal article (Bulletin du Jardin Botanique de Buitenzorg)	190	widely considered the most important monograph on Nepenthes; 17 new species described	see article
"Nepenthaceae"	Hermann Harms	1936	German	part of Die natürlichen Pflanzenfamilien	38	similar to Danser's treatment	
"Nepenthes di Sumatera: The genus Nepenthes of the Sumatra Island"	Rusjdi Tamin & Mitsuru Hotta	1986	Indonesian	paper (Diversity and Dynamics of Plant Life in Sumatra, Part 1)	35	3 new species described (originally nomina nuda as they were published without Latin diagnoses)	
"Pitcher-plants of East Malaysia and Brunei"	Anthea Phillipps & Anthony Lamb	1988	English	journal article (Nature Malaysiana)	20	includes 80 colour photographs	
"An account of Nepenthes in New Guinea"	Matthew Jebb	1991	English	journal article (Science in New Guinea)	48	includes a survey of pitcher prey assemblages	see article
"A skeletal revision of Nepenthes (Nepenthaceae)"	Matthew Jebb & Martin Cheek	1997	English	journal article (Blumea)	106	6 new species described; 1 new species combination	see article
"Nepenthaceae"	Martin Cheek & Matthew Jebb	2001	English	fifteenth volume of Flora Malesiana	iv + 157	only covers species native to Malesia	see article

== Children's literature ==
Name	Author(s)	Year	Language	Publisher	Pages	Additional information	Reviews
Jack & the Carnivorous Pitcher Plant	Tan Wee Kiat & Amy Sabrielo	1999	English	Landmark Books	83	illustrated by Lesley Gan; dust jacket folds out into a Nepenthes-themed board game	
Singapore Heritage: the Raffles Pitcher Plant	Tan Wee Kiat	2003	English	Singapore Philatelic Museum	16	covers stamps, currency and phone cards featuring Nepenthes; single-page foreword and appendix not included in page count	

== Notes ==
a. Year 2552 in the Thai solar calendar.
