= The Nepenthaceae of the Netherlands Indies =

1928 monograph by B. H. Danser

A typical line drawing from Danser's monograph, showing three herbarium specimens of the natural hybrid Nepenthes × hookeriana. The plant material illustrated includes a lower pitcher, an upper pitcher, a female inflorescence, an infructescence, and a portion of the stem. This figure was produced by Amir Hamzah, a draughtsman of the Buitenzorg Herbarium, under the direction of B. H. Danser.

"The Nepenthaceae of the Netherlands Indies" is a seminal monograph by B. H. Danser on the tropical pitcher plants of the Dutch East Indies and surrounding regions. It was originally published in the Bulletin du Jardin Botanique de Buitenzorg in 1928, and reprinted by Natural History Publications (Borneo) in 2006.

== Content ==
Danser focused on species native to the Dutch East Indies, North Borneo, the Malay Peninsula, and eastern New Guinea (an area roughly corresponding to Malesia minus the Philippines); species from outlying areas were only mentioned in the general discussion.^{[note a]}

Danser recognised 65 species in total, of which 52 were given detailed treatments.^{[note a]} This number included 17 newly described taxa: N. carunculata (later synonymised with N. bongso), N. clipeata, N. dubia, N. ephippiata, N. fusca, N. inermis, N. insignis, N. leptochila (later synonymised with N. hirsuta), N. mollis, N. paniculata, N. papuana, N. pectinata (later synonymised with N. gymnamphora), N. petiolata, N. pilosa, N. spectabilis, N. tobaica, and N. tomoriana. All were described in great detail, with many accompanied by line drawings. Danser synonymised N. edwardsiana with N. villosa, N. hemsleyana with N. rafflesiana, and N. ramispina with N. gracillima; all three were later reinstated as valid species.

Following this exhaustive revision of the genus, Danser described only two more Nepenthes species: Nepenthes spathulata in 1935 and Nepenthes densiflora in 1940, with both descriptions also published in the Bulletin du Jardin Botanique de Buitenzorg.

=== Species ===
Danser recognised the following 65 taxa as valid species (though some, such as N. oblanceolata, only tentatively so). The 13 taxa denoted with an asterisk (*) fall outside the monograph's geographical focus and are only mentioned in its general discussion.^{[note a]}

1. N. alata
2. N. albomarginata
3. N. ampullaria
4. N. anamensis *
5. N. bicalcarata
6. N. bongso
7. N. boschiana
8. N. burbidgeae
9. N. burkei *
10. N. carunculata
11. N. clipeata
12. N. deaniana *
13. N. decurrens
14. N. distillatoria *
15. N. dubia
16. N. ephippiata
17. N. fusca
18. N. geoffrayi *
19. N. gracilis
20. N. gracillima
21. N. gymnamphora
22. N. hirsuta
23. N. hookeriana
24. N. inermis
25. N. insignis
26. N. kampotiana *
27. N. khasiana *
28. N. klossii
29. N. leptochila
30. N. lowii
31. N. macfarlanei
32. N. madagascariensis *
33. N. maxima
34. N. merrilliana
35. N. mirabilis
36. N. mollis
37. N. neglecta
38. N. neoguineensis
39. N. northiana
40. N. oblanceolata
41. N. paniculata
42. N. papuana
43. N. pectinata
44. N. pervillei *
45. N. petiolata^{[note a]}
46. N. philippinensis *
47. N. pilosa
48. N. rafflesiana
49. N. rajah
50. N. reinwardtiana
51. N. sanguinea
52. N. singalana
53. N. spectabilis
54. N. stenophylla
55. N. tentaculata
56. N. thorelii *
57. N. tobaica
58. N. tomoriana
59. N. treubiana
60. N. trichocarpa
61. N. truncata *
62. N. veitchii
63. N. ventricosa *
64. N. vieillardii
65. N. villosa

=== Infrageneric classification ===
Danser divided the genus Nepenthes into six clades based on observations of herbarium material. The clades were the Vulgatae, Montanae, Nobiles, Regiae, Insignes, and Urceolatae. Danser's classification was undoubtedly a great improvement on previous attempts, and forms the basis for more recent monographs, such as those of Charles Clarke (Nepenthes of Borneo and Nepenthes of Sumatra and Peninsular Malaysia) and Matthew Jebb and Martin Cheek ("A skeletal revision of Nepenthes (Nepenthaceae)" and "Nepenthaceae"). Charles Clarke writes that Danser's monograph "remains the definitive taxonomic work on Nepenthes" and explains its importance as follows:

The discoveries of the early 20th century were brought together by Danser and neatly integrated to shed light on many of the unsolved problems of Macfarlane's monograph. Although he did not collect the material he used, Danser seemed to have gained a good understanding of the genus, which extended beyond classical taxonomy. He speculated about the relationships between certain species on the basis of their evolution and ecology as much as their structural characteristics–something that nobody had done previously.

== Reprint ==
The Nepenthaceae of the Netherlands Indies
- Cover showing painting of N. lowii by Sia Yek Chung
- Author: B. H. Danser (introduction by Charles Clarke)
- Language: English
- Publisher: Natural History Publications (Borneo)
- Publication date: April 2006
- Media type: Print (hardcover)
- Pages: vi + 206
- ISBN: 983-812-115-0
- OCLC: 78887282

Danser's monograph was reprinted by Natural History Publications (Borneo) in April 2006 with a 15-page introduction by ecologist and botanist Charles Clarke.

=== Reviews ===
The 2006 reprint was reviewed by Barry Rice in the September 2007 issue of the Carnivorous Plant Newsletter:

Having a high quality copy of the work is very desirable so you can easily cross reference its contents with subsequent Nepenthes monographs. The line drawings are far more nicely presented than can be obtained from photocopied or web versions.

To add further delight to the pleasure, the famous Nepenthes expert Dr. Charles Clarke helps lead this voyage of adventure on the high seas of Nepenthes history, by prefacing the work with a fifteen page discussion of Danser—both the man and the eponymous work. With Clarke as your Admiral at the helm, Danser is more approachable than ever before.

Rice pointed out the "[u]nfortunate omissions" of Danser's 1935 and 1940 papers, but concluded by saying that "the new version of Danser (1928) is still a valuable addition to our ever-enlarging collections of carnivorous plant books".

== Notes ==
a. Danser's monograph includes a formal description of N. petiolata, but as a Philippine endemic this plant is excluded from the official species count, which comes to 51.
