= Nepenthes of Borneo =

1997 botanical monograph by Charles Clarke

- Cover of first edition, showing N. rajah
- Author: Charles Clarke
- Language: English
- Publisher: Natural History Publications (Borneo)
- Publication date: 1997 (reprinted in 2006)
- Media type: Print (hardcover)
- Pages: xii + 207
- ISBN: 983-812-015-4
- OCLC: 475095167

Nepenthes of Borneo is a monograph by Charles Clarke on the tropical pitcher plants of Borneo. It was first published in 1997 by Natural History Publications (Borneo), and reprinted in 2006. Clarke describes it as "primarily an ecological monograph".

== Content ==
The book describes and illustrates 31 species in detail. A further two "undescribed and incompletely diagnosed taxa" are included: Nepenthes sp. A (possibly a form of N. fusca) and Nepenthes sp. B (later described as N. hurrelliana). Six taxa are also covered under "dubious species and erroneous records": N. alata, N. gymnamphora, N. macfarlanei, and N. maxima (which are all shown to be absent from the island); N. sp. "elegance" (which is recognised as a variety of N. rafflesiana, was later described by Clarke and colleagues as N. baramensis, and is now recognised as N. hemsleyana); and N. neglecta (which Clarke suggests is a natural hybrid between N. gracilis and N. mirabilis). The monograph also provides brief descriptions of 16 selected natural hybrids.

The taxonomy presented in Nepenthes of Borneo almost wholly agrees with that of Matthew Jebb and Martin Cheek's 1997 monograph, "A skeletal revision of Nepenthes (Nepenthaceae)". Clarke makes only two major revisions: restoring N. faizaliana as a distinct species and sinking N. borneensis in synonymy with N. boschiana.

In the book's preface, Clarke writes:

My aim is to provide a balanced, first-hand account of the plants in an ecological context, partly based on the research I performed on them in Brunei in 1989 and 1990. This information is intended to complement the recent taxonomic revision of Nepenthes by M. Jebb and M. Cheek.

=== Species ===
The following taxa are covered in the book, with 31 recognised as valid species.

1. N. albomarginata
2. N. ampullaria
3. N. bicalcarata
4. N. boschiana
5. N. burbidgeae
6. N. campanulata
7. N. clipeata
8. N. edwardsiana
9. N. ephippiata
10. N. faizaliana
11. N. fusca
12. N. gracilis
13. N. hirsuta
14. N. hispida
15. N. lowii
16. N. macrophylla
17. N. macrovulgaris
18. N. mapuluensis
19. N. mirabilis
20. N. mollis
21. N. muluensis
22. N. murudensis
23. N. northiana
24. N. pilosa
25. N. rafflesiana
26. N. rajah
27. N. reinwardtiana
28. N. stenophylla
29. N. tentaculata
30. N. veitchii
31. N. villosa

Dubious species and erroneous records

1. N. alata
2. N. sp. "elegance" (N. hemsleyana)
3. N. gymnamphora
4. N. macfarlanei
5. N. maxima
6. N. neglecta

Undescribed and incompletely diagnosed taxa

1. N. sp. A (?N. fusca)
2. N. sp. B (N. hurrelliana)

== Reviews ==
Barry Meyers-Rice reviewed Nepenthes of Borneo in the December 1998 issue of the Carnivorous Plant Newsletter. He described the work as a "good, solid book that treats its subject very well". Rice praised the publication's habitat photographs and wrote that the "[c]ontent that really makes this book interesting and different from other carnivorous plant books is its emphasis on the context of Nepenthes in its natural habitat".

Nepenthes of Borneo was also reviewed by Miroslav Holub and Zdeněk Žáček in a 1998 issue of Trifid and Martin Spousta in a 2008 issue of Trifid Interinfo.
