= Mount Kemul =

Mountain in Kalimantan, Borneo

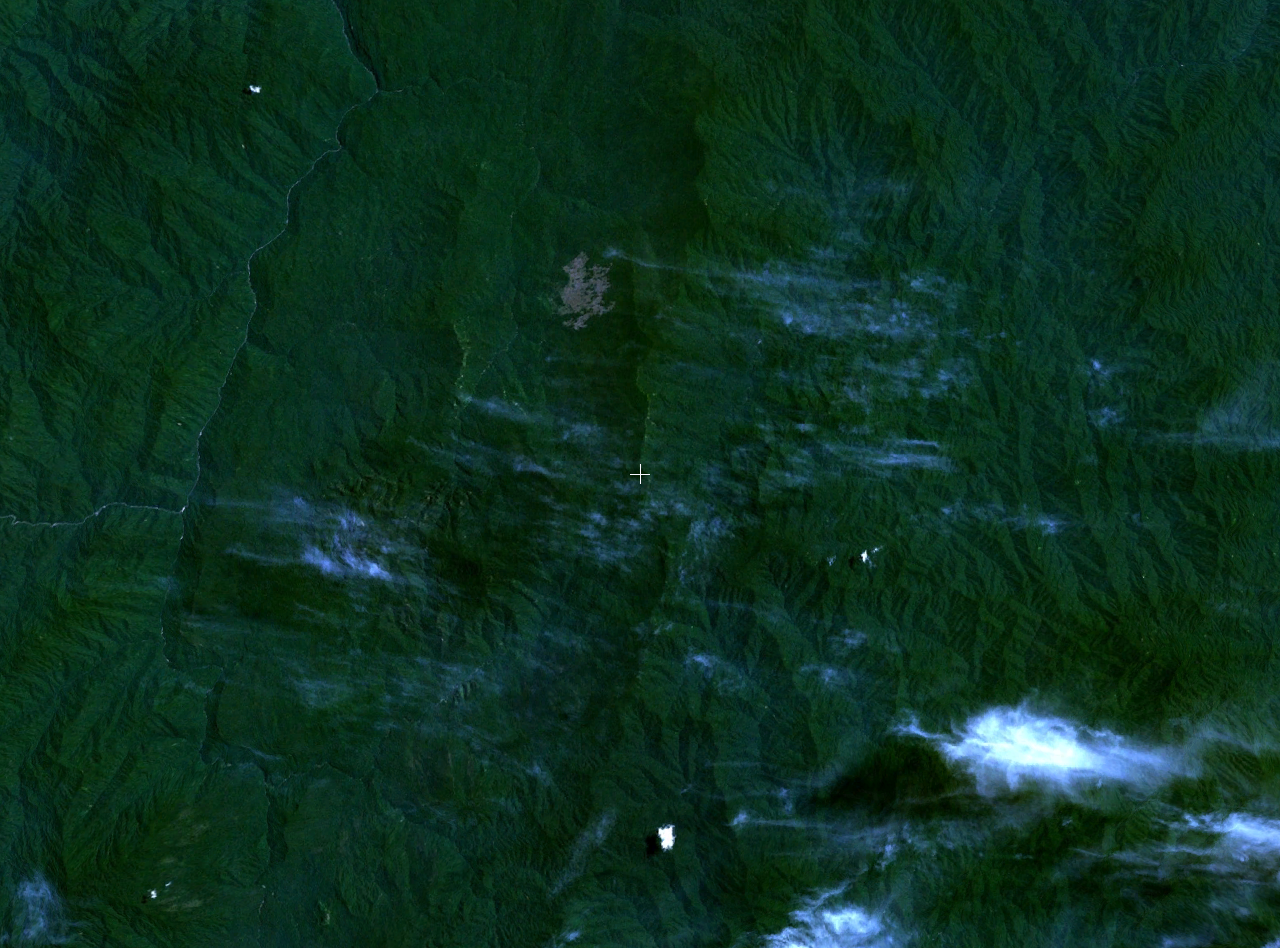
- Satellite view of Mount Kemul, indicated by crosshair, and surrounding regions.

Highest point
- Elevation: 1,847 m (6,060 ft)
- Coordinates: 1°51′37″N 116°10′35″E

Geography
- Location: East Kalimantan, Borneo

Mount Kemul (also Kemoel, Kemal, Kongkemul, Kong Kemul) (Indonesian: Gunung Kemul) is a mountain in East Kalimantan. It is the type locality of the pitcher plant species Nepenthes fusca and Nepenthes mollis.
