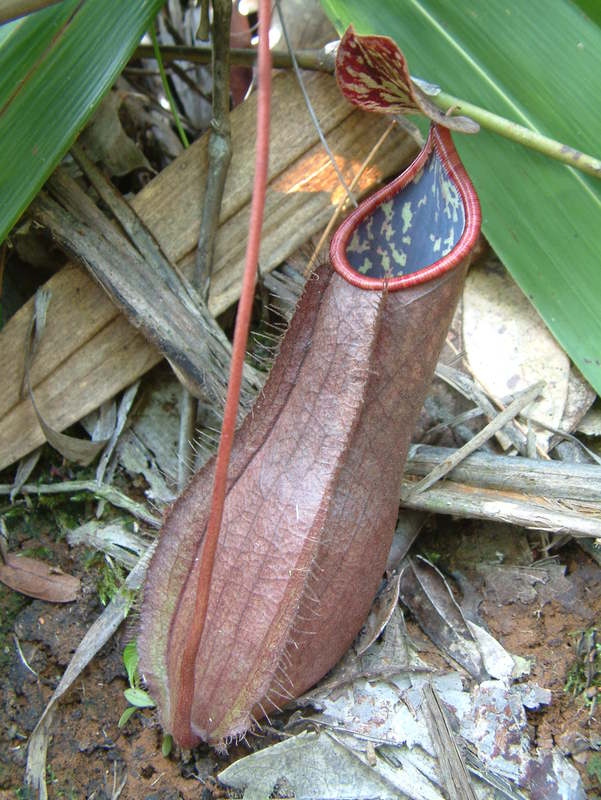
- Lower pitcher of Nepenthes tomoriana

Conservation status
- Least Concern (IUCN 3.1)

Scientific classification
- Kingdom: Plantae
- Clade: Tracheophytes
- Clade: Angiosperms
- Clade: Eudicots
- Order: Caryophyllales
- Family: Nepenthaceae
- Genus: Nepenthes
- Species: N. tomoriana

Binomial name
- Nepenthes tomoriana Danser (1928)

= Nepenthes tomoriana =

Species of pitcher plant from Sulawesi

Nepenthes tomoriana (/nɪˈpɛnθiːz təˌmɒriˈɑːnə/; after Tomori Bay, from which the type originates) is a species of pitcher plant endemic to Sulawesi, where it grows at an elevation of 0–500 m above sea level.

Nepenthes tomoriana holotype (Rachmat 645)

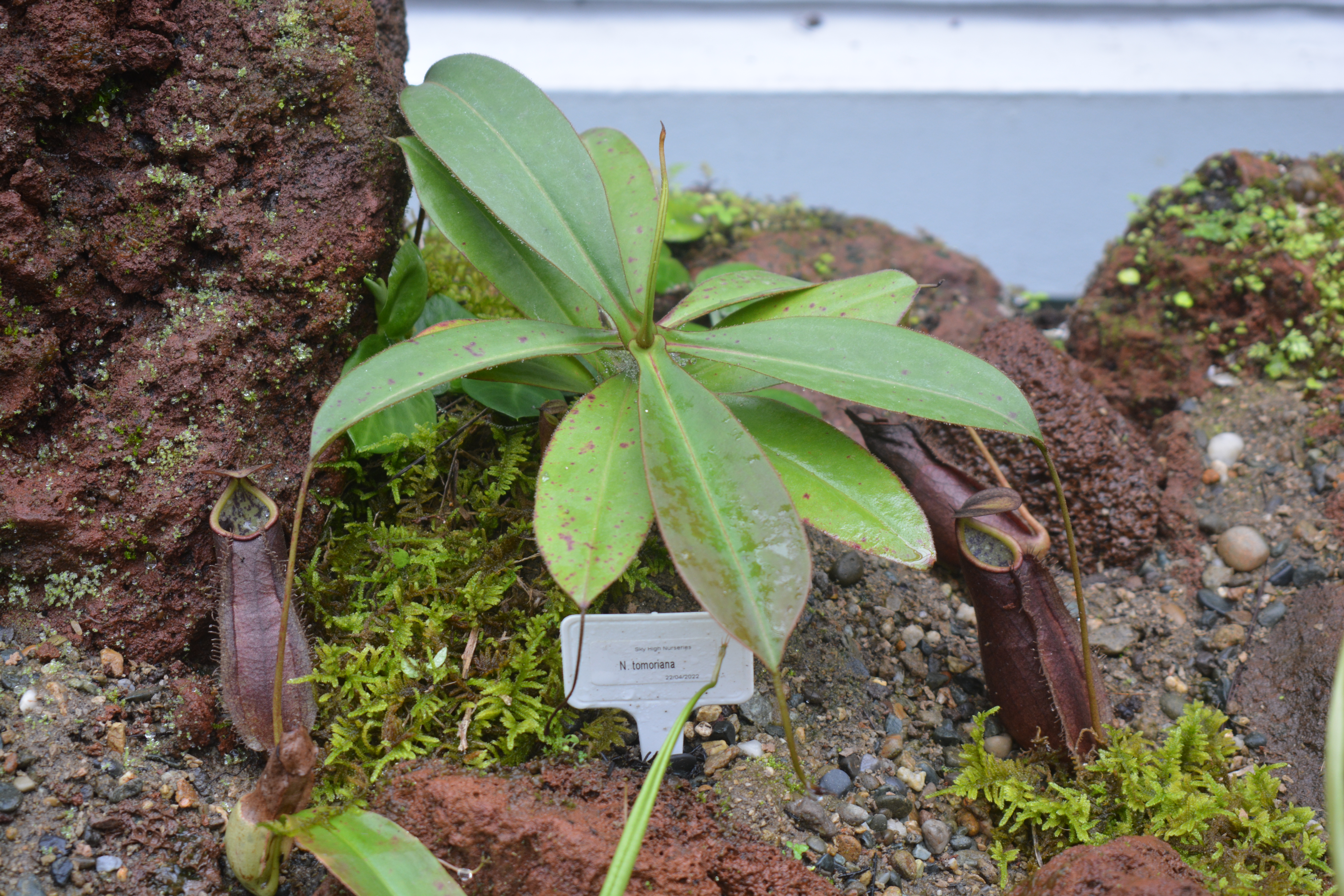
Nepenthes tomoriana in the Bogor Botanical Gardens

== Natural hybrids ==
- N. mirabilis × N. tomoriana
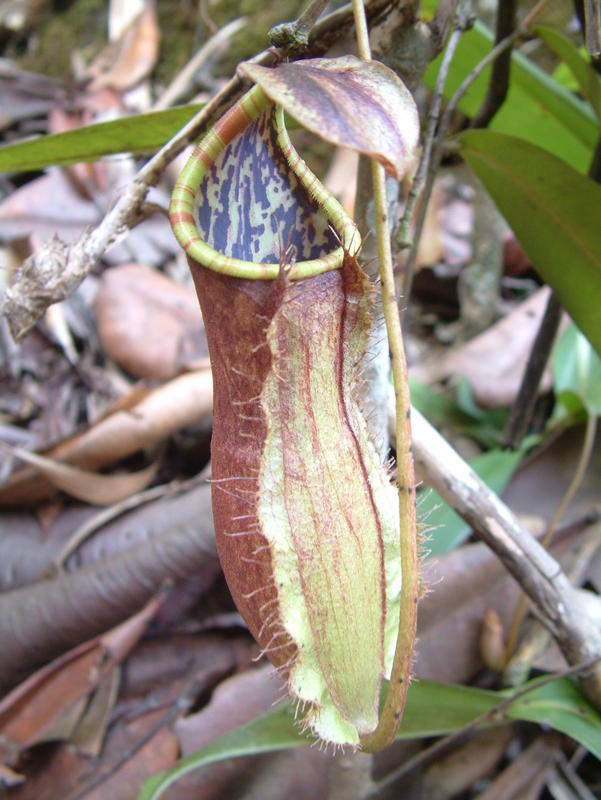
? N. mirabilis × N. tomoriana
