= Charles Clarke (botanist) =

Australian botanist

Dr. Charles M. Clarke (born in Melbourne, Australia) is an ecologist and botanist specialising in the carnivorous plant genus Nepenthes, for which he is regarded as a world authority. Clarke has an honours degree in Botany from Monash University in Melbourne, and a Ph.D. in Ecosystem management at the University of New England, in Armidale, New South Wales.

Clarke first travelled to Borneo in search of pitcher plants in 1987. In 1989 and 1990 he lived in Brunei, studying the ecology of Nepenthes. In between travels, Clarke has taught Ecology and Biometrics at James Cook University in Queensland, and worked as a horticultural consultant in Hong Kong.

He now works at the Cairns Botanic Garden. Clarke has written five books and guides on Nepenthes, which present a synthesis of the research performed on his travels around the Malay Archipelago. The most significant of these works are the monographs Nepenthes of Borneo (1997) and Nepenthes of Sumatra and Peninsular Malaysia (2001).

Clarke has described six species of Nepenthes: N. baramensis (now known as N. hemsleyana), N. benstonei, N. chaniana, N. izumiae, N. jacquelineae, and N. tenax.

== Publications ==
- Clarke, C., Schlauer, J., Moran, J. & Robinson, A.S., 2018. Systematics and evolution of Nepenthes. In: Ellison, A.M. & Adamec, L., eds.: Carnivorous plants: physiology, ecology, and evolution. Oxford University Press, 58-69. doi:10.1093/oso/9780198779841.003.0005
- Clarke, C.M. 1992. The ecology of metazoan communities in Nepenthes pitcher plants in Borneo, with special reference to the community of Nepenthes bicalcarata Hook.f. Ph.D. thesis, University of New England, Armidale, N.S.W. 269 pp.
- Clarke, C.[M.] 1993. "The Possible Functions of the Thorns of Nepenthes bicalcarata (Hook.f.) Pitchers" (PDF). (194 KiB) Carnivorous Plant Newsletter 22(1–2): 27–28.
- Clarke, C.M. & R.L. Kitching 1993. The Metazoan Food Webs from Six Bornean Nepenthes Species. Ecological Entomology 18: 7–16.
- Clarke, C.M. & J.A. Moran 1994. A further record of aerial pitchers in Nepenthes ampullaria Jack. Malayan Nature Journal 47: 321–323.
- Clarke, C.M. & R.L. Kitching 1995. Swimming Ants and Pitcher Plants: a Unique Ant-Plant Interaction from Borneo. Journal of Tropical Ecology 11(4): 589–602.
- Clarke, C.M. 1997. Nepenthes of Borneo. Natural History Publications (Borneo), Kota Kinabalu. xi + 207 pp.
- Clarke, C.M. 1997. Another nice trip to Sumatra. Carnivorous Plant Newsletter 26(1): 4–10.
- Clarke, C.M. 1997. The effects of pitcher dimorphism on the metazoan community of the carnivorous pitcher plant Nepenthes bicalcarata Hook.f. Malayan Nature Journal 50: 149–157.
- Clarke, C.M. 1998. Initial colonisation and prey capture in Nepenthes bicalcarata (Nepenthaceae) pitchers in Brunei. Sandakania 12: 27–36.
- Clarke, C.M. 1998. The aquatic arthropod community of the pitcher plant, Nepenthes bicalcarata (Nepenthaceae) in Brunei. Sandakania 11: 55–60.
- Clarke, C.M. 1998. A re-examination of geographical variation in Nepenthes food webs. Ecography 21(4): 430–436. doi:10.1111/j.1600-0587.1998.tb00408.x
- Clarke, C.M. 1999. Nepenthes benstonei (Nepenthaceae), a new pitcher plant from Peninsular Malaysia. Sandakania 13: 79–87.
- Clarke, C.M. 2001. Ecology & Conservation of Montane Nepenthes (Nepenthaceae) in Sumatra. Fourth International Flora Malesiana Symposium. 20–24 July 1998, Kuala Lumpur.
- Clarke, C.M. 2001. Nepenthes of Sumatra and Peninsular Malaysia. Natural History Publications (Borneo), Kota Kinabalu. ix + 325 pp.
- Clarke, C.M. 2001. A Guide to the Pitcher Plants of Sabah. Natural History Publications (Borneo), Kota Kinabalu. iv + 40 pp.
- Moran, J.A., M.A. Merbach, N.J. Livingston, C.M. Clarke & W.E. Booth 2001. "Termite Prey Specialization in the Pitcher Plant Nepenthes albomarginata - Evidence from Stable Isotope Analysis". Archived from the original (PDF) on 4 January 2020. Annals of Botany 88: 307–311.
- Clarke, C.M. 2002. A Guide to the Pitcher Plants of Peninsular Malaysia. Natural History Publications (Borneo), Kota Kinabalu. iv + 32 pp.
- Clarke, C.M., T. Davis & R. Tamin 2003. Nepenthes izumiae (Nepenthaceae): a new species from Sumatra. Blumea 48: 179–182.
- Moran, J.A., C.M. Clarke & B.J. Hawkins 2003. From Carnivore to Detritivore? Isotopic Evidence for Leaf Litter Utilization by the Tropical Pitcher Plant Nepenthes ampullaria. International Journal of Plant Sciences 164: 635–639.
- Dong, T.T.X., Q.M. Xiao, C.M. Clarke, H.S. Zhong, N.J. Zhao, K.L. Chun & K.W.K. Tsim 2003. Phylogeny of Astragalus in China: Molecular evidence from the DNA sequences of 5S rRNA spacer, ITS, and 18S rRNA. Journal of Agricultural and Food Chemistry 51(23): 6709–6714.
- Clarke, C.M. & C.C. Lee 2004. A Pocket Guide: Pitcher Plants of Sarawak. Natural History Publications (Borneo), Kota Kinabalu. vi + 81 pp.
- Cantley, R., C.M. Clarke, J. Cokendolpher, B. Rice & A. Wistuba 2004. Nepenthes clipeata Survival Project. International Carnivorous Plant Society.
- Clarke, C.M., C.C. Lee & S. McPherson 2006. Nepenthes chaniana (Nepenthaceae), a new species from north-western Borneo. Sabah Parks Journal 7: 53–66.
- Clarke, C.M & R. Kruger 2006. Nepenthes tenax C.Clarke and R.Kruger (Nepenthaceae), a new species from Cape York Peninsula, Queensland. Austrobaileya 7(2): 319–324.
- Clarke, C.M. 2006. Introduction. In: Danser, B.H. The Nepenthaceae of the Netherlands Indies. Natural History Publications (Borneo), Kota Kinabalu. pp. 1–15
- Clarke, C.M., U. Bauer, C.C. Lee, A.A. Tuen, K. Rembold & J.A. Moran 2009. "Tree shrew lavatories: a novel nitrogen sequestration strategy in a tropical pitcher plant" (PDF). Archived from the original (PDF) on 19 July 2011. Biology Letters 5(5): 632–635. doi:10.1098/rsbl.2009.0311
- Chin, L., J.A. Moran & C. Clarke 2010. Trap geometry in three giant montane pitcher plant species from Borneo is a function of tree shrew body size. New Phytologist 186 (2): 461–470. doi:10.1111/j.1469-8137.2009.03166.x
- Clarke, C.M., J.A. Moran & L. Chin 2010. Mutualism between tree shrews and pitcher plants: perspectives and avenues for future research. Plant Signaling & Behavior 5(10): 1187–1189. doi:10.4161/psb.5.10.12807
- Clarke, C., J.A. Moran & C.C. Lee 2011. Nepenthes baramensis (Nepenthaceae) – a new species from north-western Borneo . Blumea 56(3): 229–233. doi:10.3767/000651911X607121
