= Over het geslacht Nepenthes =

"Over het geslacht Nepenthes" (lit. "Concerning the genus Nepenthes") is a Dutch-language monograph by Pieter Willem Korthals on the tropical pitcher plants of the genus Nepenthes. It was published in 1839 in Coenraad Jacob Temminck's Verhandelingen over de Natuurlijke Geschiedenis der Nederlandsche overzeesche bezittingen. It is generally regarded as the first monograph on Nepenthes.

Korthals recognised 9 species: N. ampullaria, N. bongso, N. boschiana, N. distillatoria, N. gracilis, N. gymnamphora, N. madagascariensis, N. phyllamphora (now known as N. mirabilis), and N. rafflesiana. Three of these—N. bongso, N. boschiana, and N. gracilis—were described for the first time, and six were illustrated with hand-coloured lithographs.

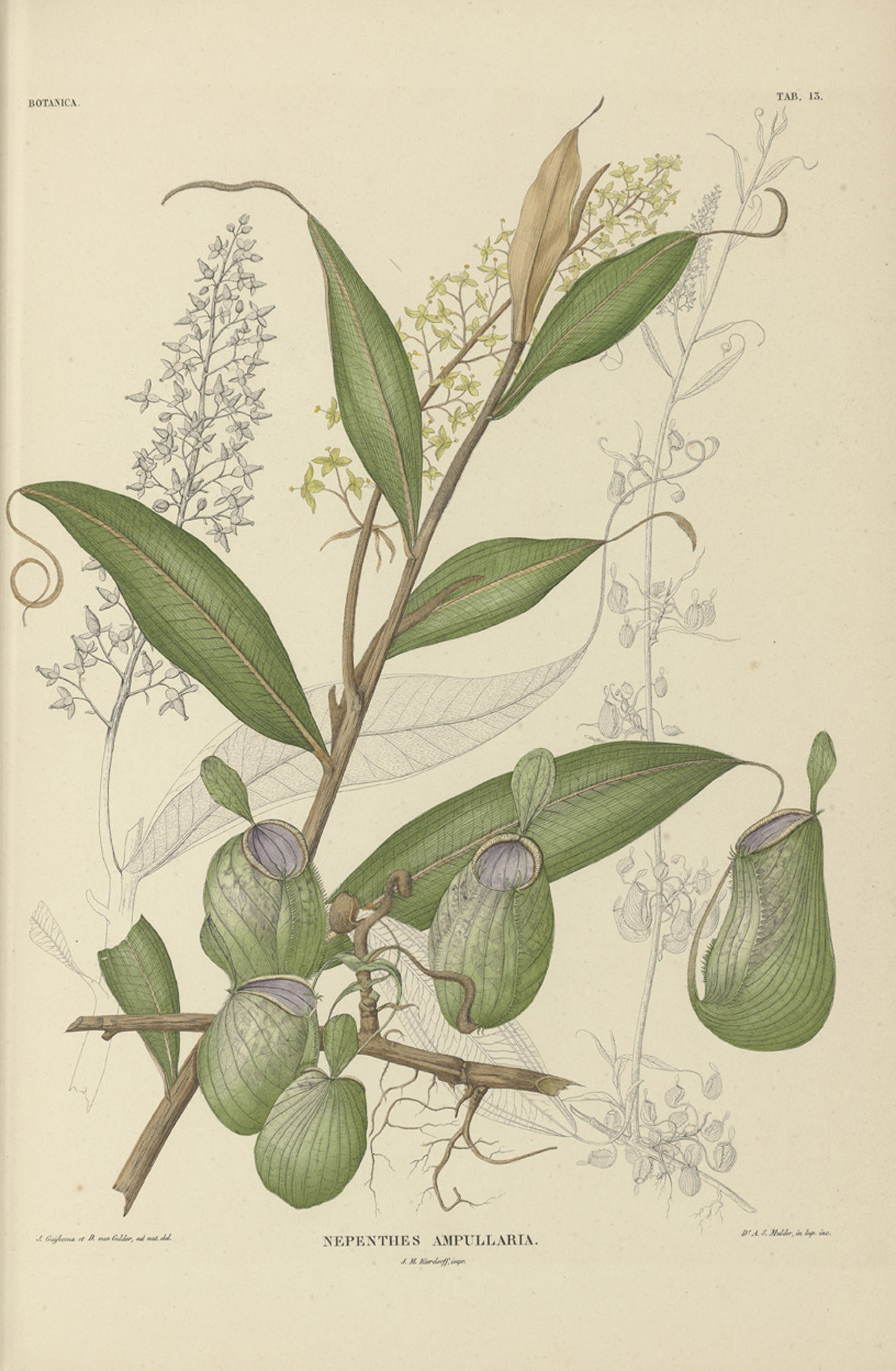
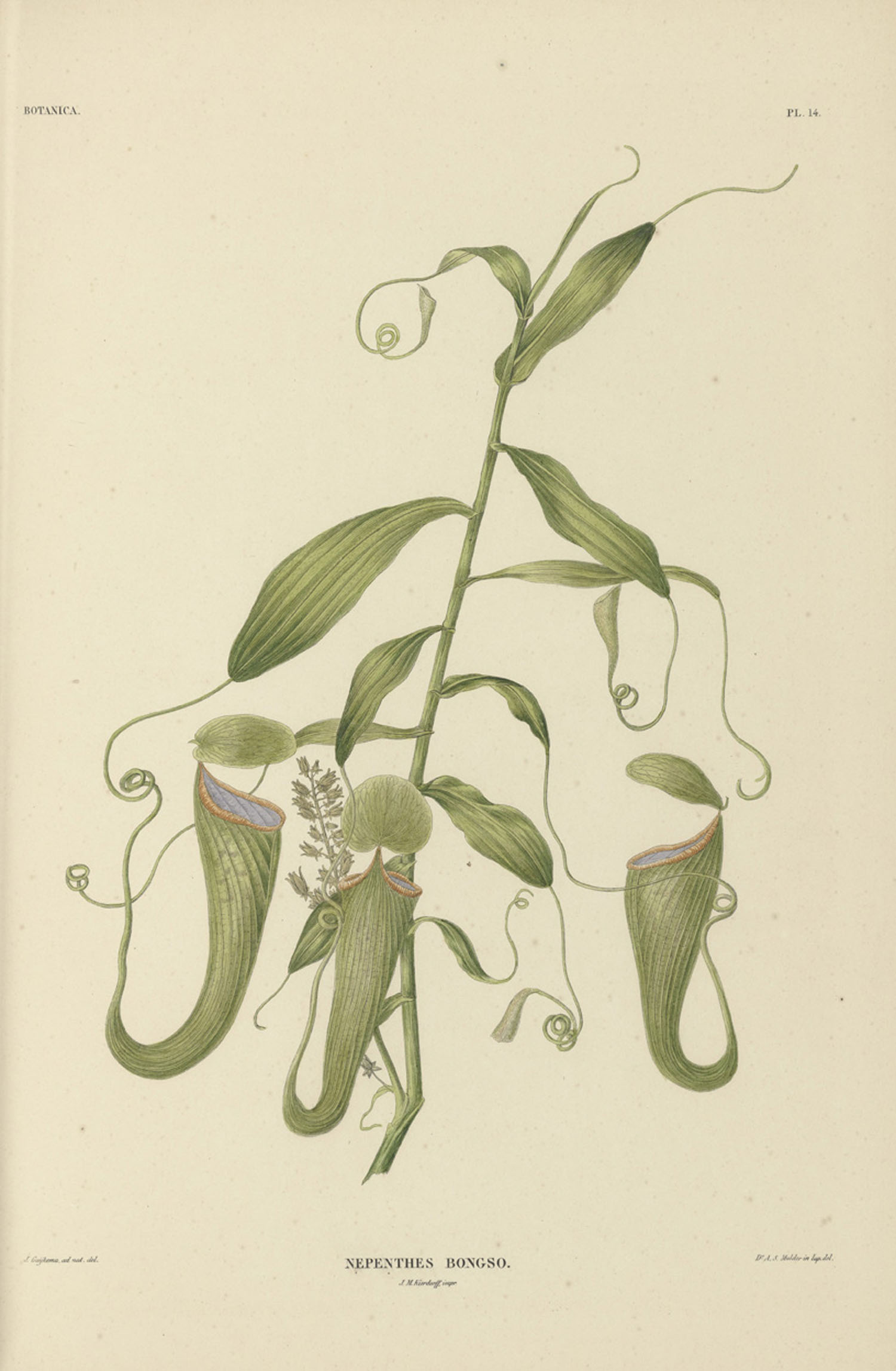
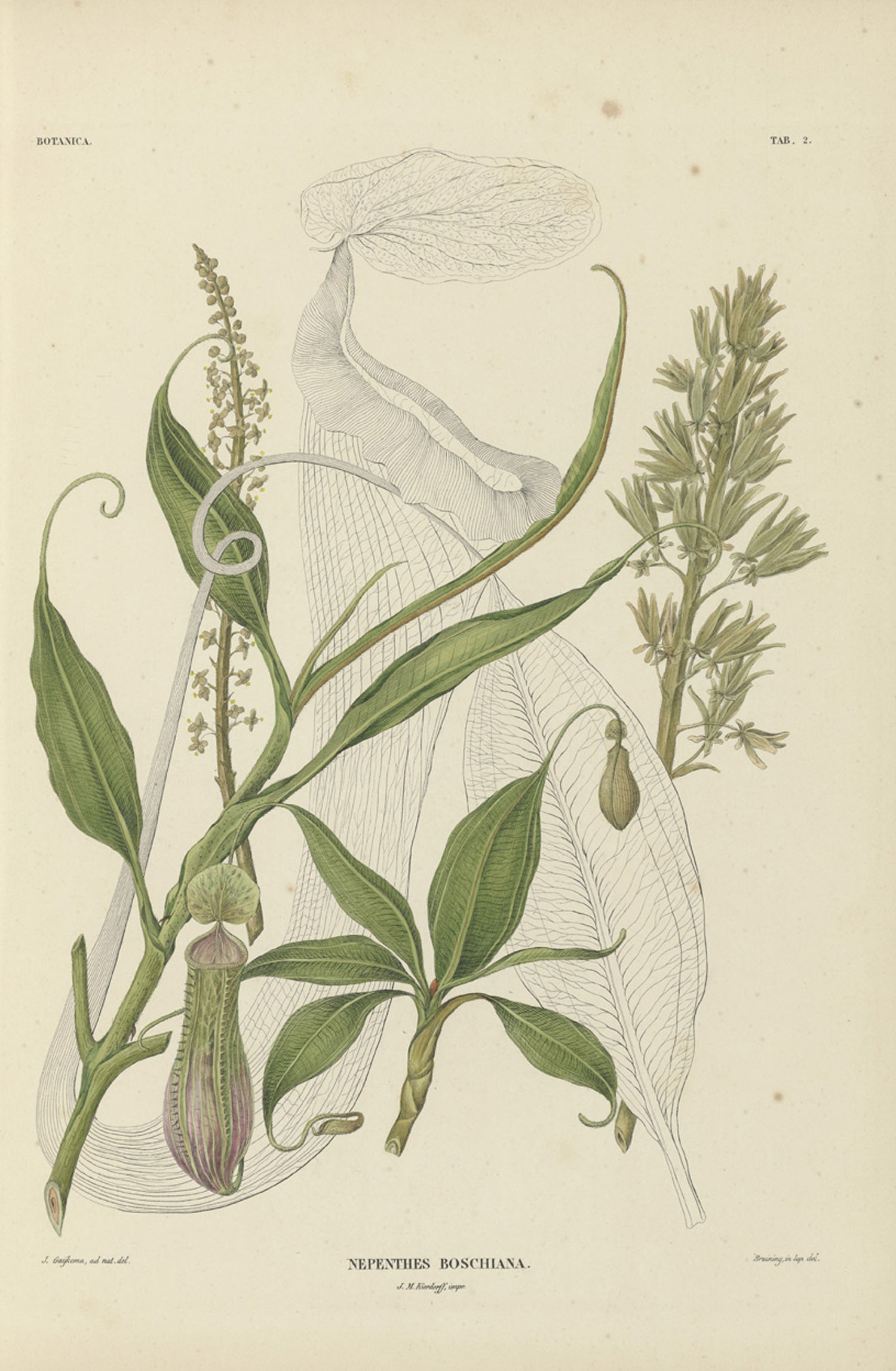
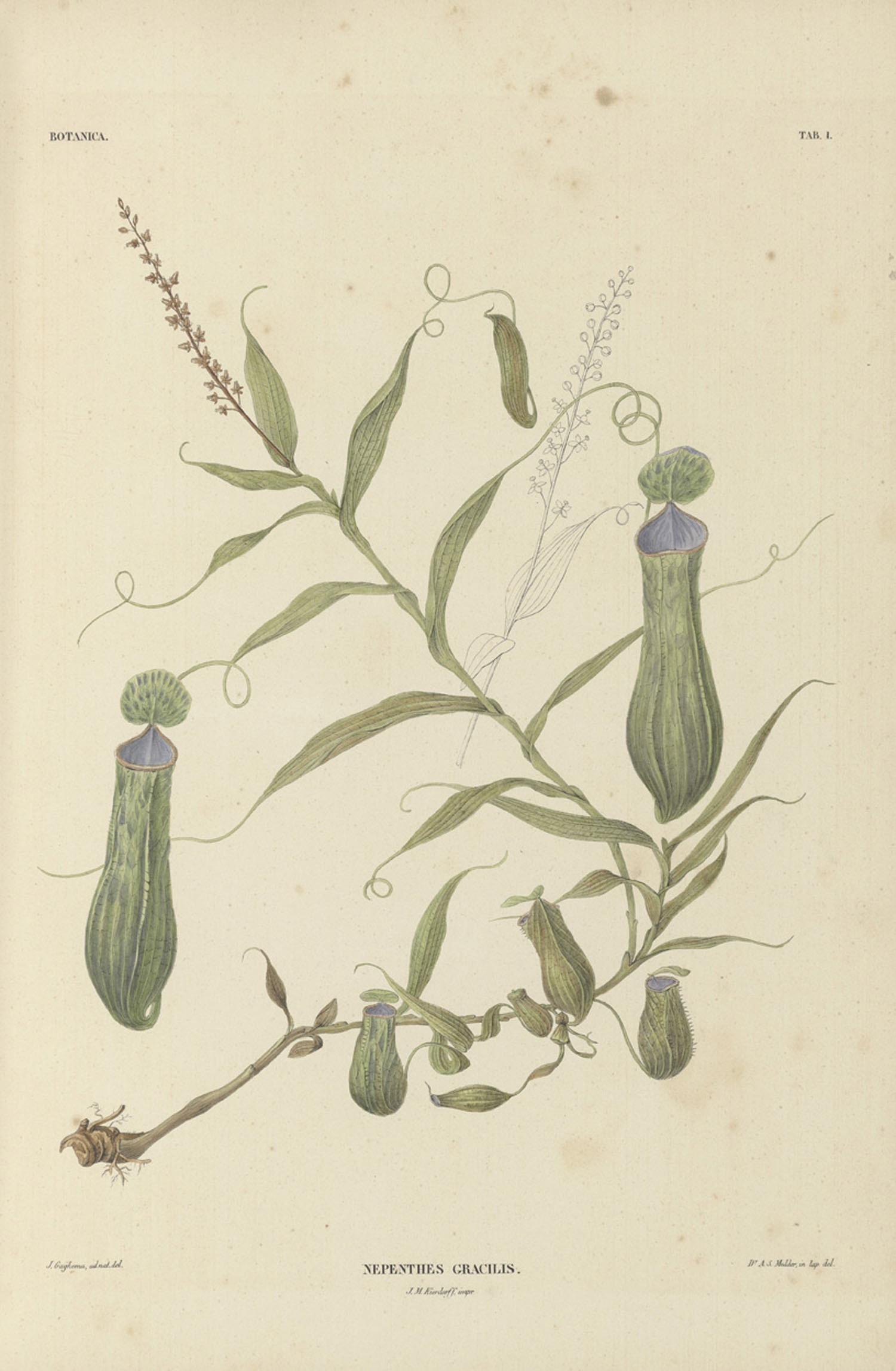
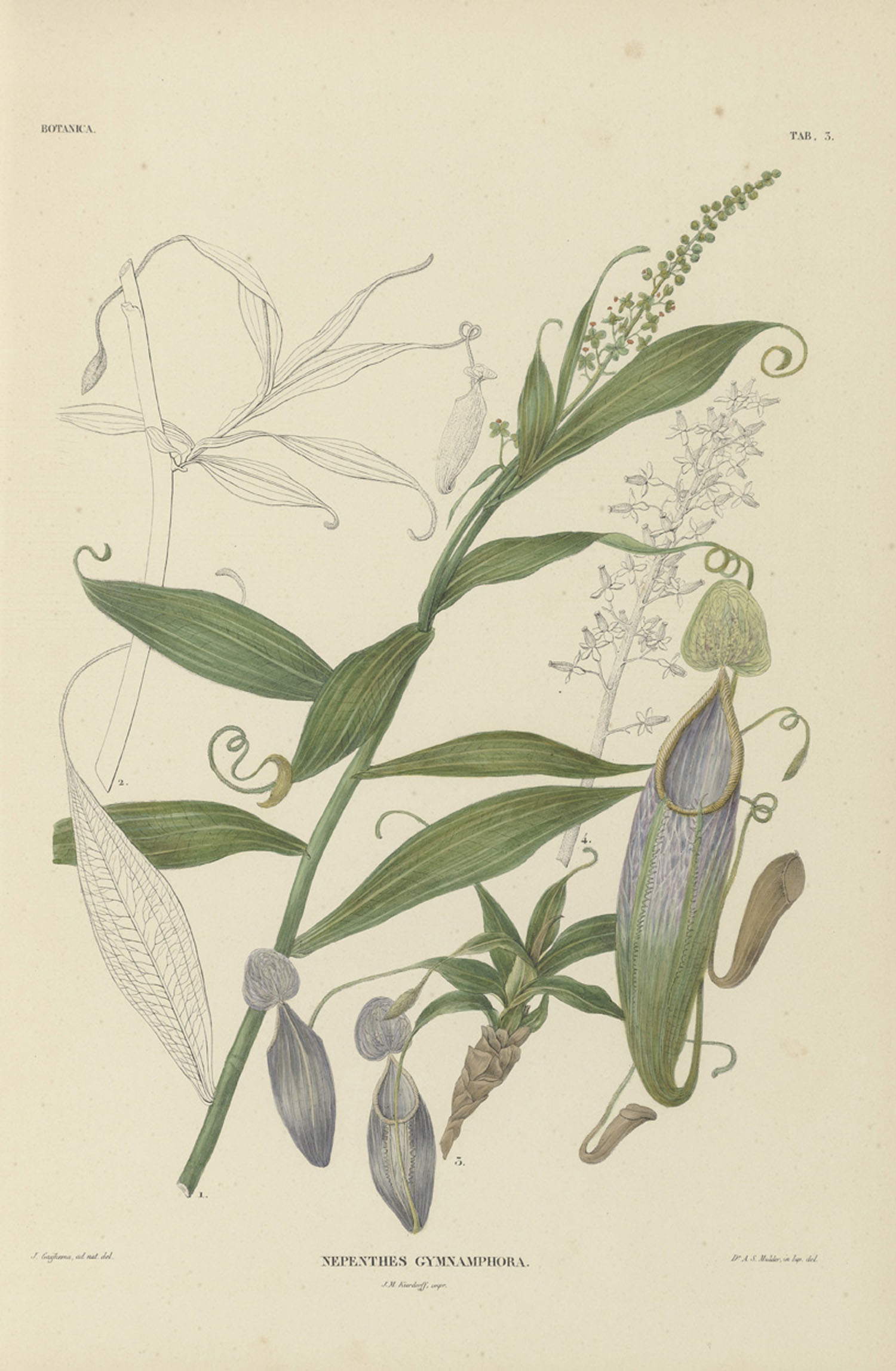
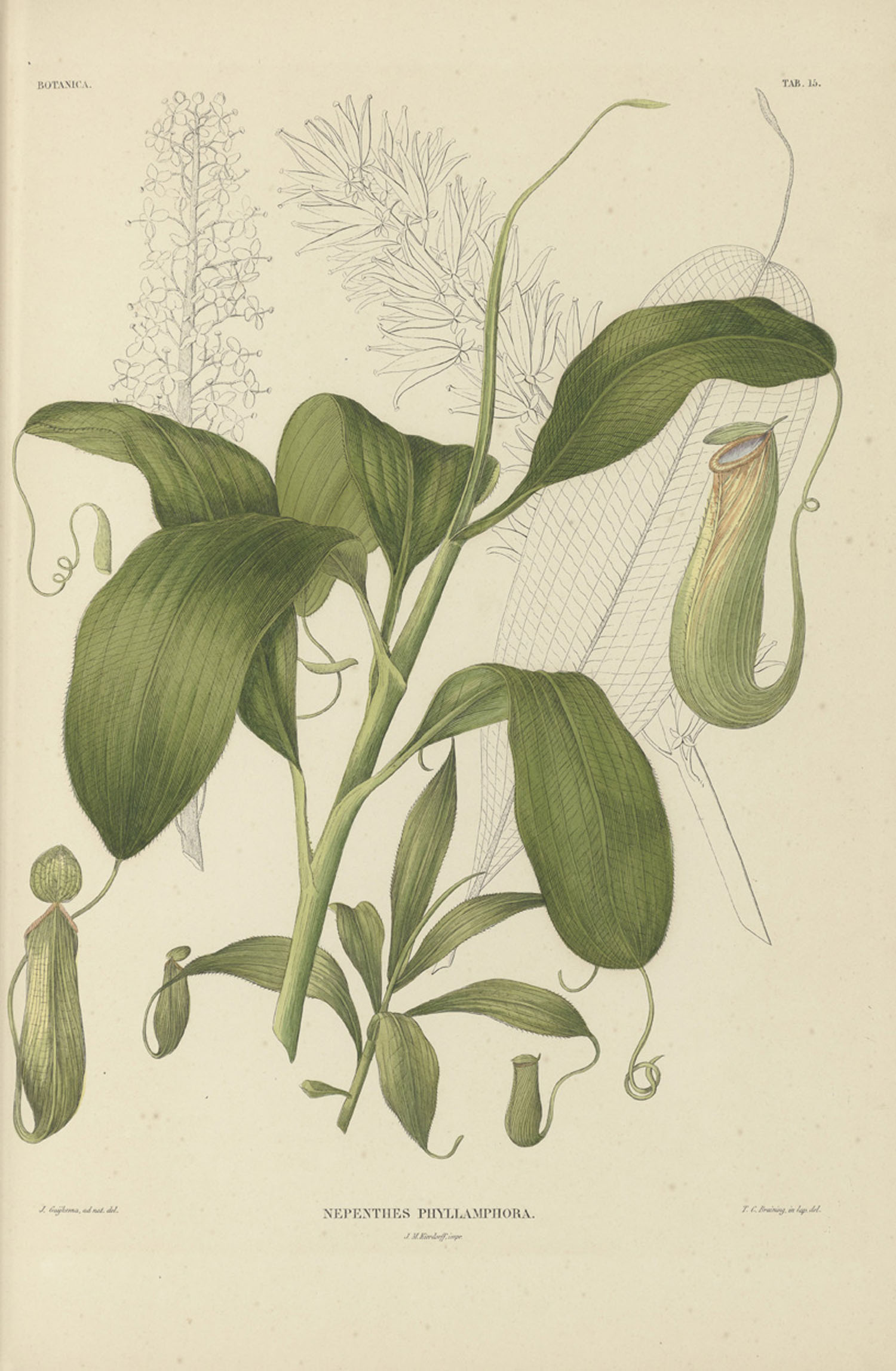
The six hand-coloured lithographs from Korthals's monograph (left to right): N. ampullaria, N. bongso, N. boschiana, N. gracilis, N. gymnamphora, and N. phyllamphora (N. mirabilis)
