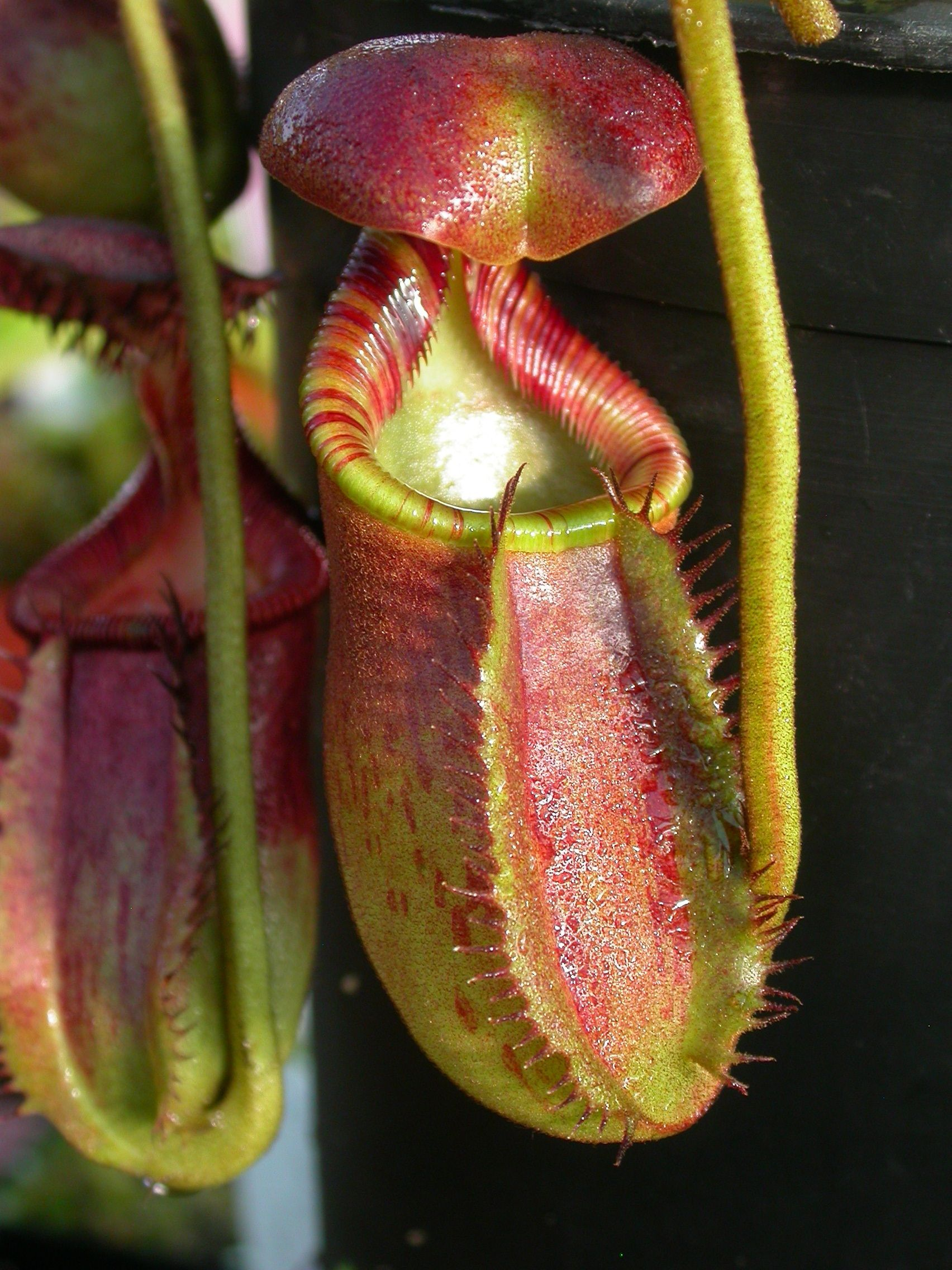
- Nepenthes ephippiata. Cultivated plant.

Conservation status
- Vulnerable (IUCN 2.3)

Scientific classification
- Kingdom: Plantae
- Clade: Embryophytes
- Clade: Tracheophytes
- Clade: Angiosperms
- Clade: Eudicots
- Order: Caryophyllales
- Family: Nepenthaceae
- Genus: Nepenthes
- Species: N. ephippiata

Binomial name
- Nepenthes ephippiata Danser (1928)
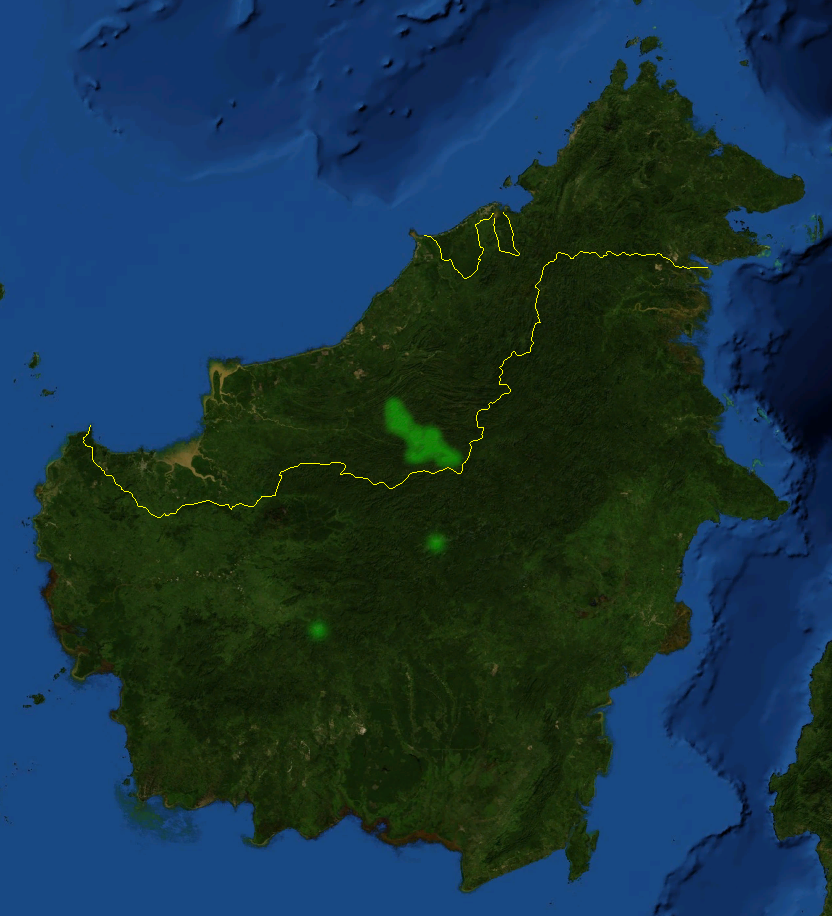
- Distribution of N. ephippiata.

= Nepenthes ephippiata =

Saddle-leaved pitcher-plant

Species of pitcher plant from Borneo

Nepenthes ephippiata (/nɪˈpɛnθiːz ɛˌfɪpiˈɑːtə/; from Latin: ephippium "saddle cloth"), or the saddle-leaved pitcher-plant, is a tropical pitcher plant endemic to Borneo. It occurs in the Hose Mountains of central Sarawak, as well as Mount Raya and Bukit Lesung in Kalimantan. It grows in montane forest from 1,000 to 1,900 meters elevation.

Non-climbing plants from the Hose Mountains appear to have less decurrent leaf attachment than specimens from Central Kalimantan, however the characteristic saddle after which the species is named is fully developed in climbing plants. Nepenthes ephippiata is closely related to N. lowii.

B. H. Danser described the species in his 1928 monograph, "The Nepenthaceae of the Netherlands Indies", based only on part of a stem and an infructescence.

Nepenthes ephippiata has no known natural hybrids.

Nepenthes ephippiata type specimen (Amdjah 497)
