= Natural History Publications (Borneo) =

Natural History Publications (Borneo) Sdn. Bhd. is a publishing house based in Kota Kinabalu, Borneo. It is among the leading English language and natural history publishers in Malaysia and the entire Southeast Asian region. The company has published numerous works relating to the biological richness of the area, with a focus on the island of Borneo, which supports one of the world's most diverse ecosystems.

The pitcher plant species Nepenthes chaniana and the world's longest known insect, Phobaeticus chani, are named after Datuk Chan Chew Lun, Managing Director of Natural History Publications (Borneo).
