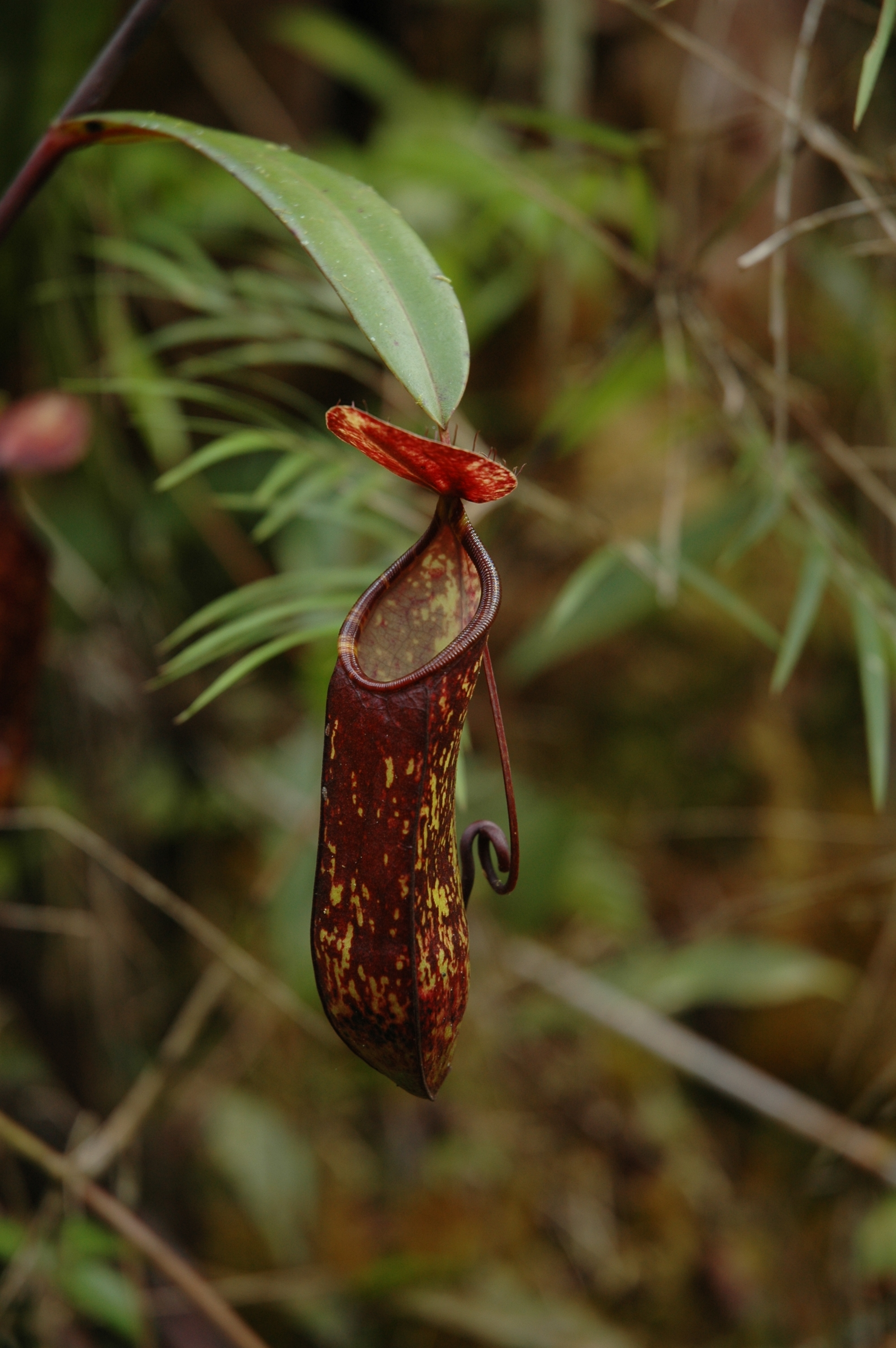
- An upper pitcher of Nepenthes muluensis from Mount Murud

Conservation status
- Least Concern (IUCN 3.1)

Scientific classification
- Kingdom: Plantae
- Clade: Tracheophytes
- Clade: Angiosperms
- Clade: Eudicots
- Order: Caryophyllales
- Family: Nepenthaceae
- Genus: Nepenthes
- Species: N. muluensis

Binomial name
- Nepenthes muluensis M.Hotta (1966)

Synonyms
- Nepenthes gracillima auct. non Ridl.: Smythies (1965)

= Nepenthes muluensis =

Tropical pitcher plant endemic to Borneo

Nepenthes muluensis /nɪˈpɛnθiːz ˌmʊluˈɛnsɪs/, or the Mulu pitcher-plant, is a tropical pitcher plant endemic to Borneo. It grows in highland habitats at elevations of 1,700 to 2,400 m above sea level.

== Botanical history ==
Nepenthes muluensis was first collected by botanist Mitsuru Hotta on March 18, 1964, on Mardi between the third and fourth camps on the western ridge of Mount Mulu, Sarawak.

The holotype, M.Hotta 14791d, is deposited at the Botany Department of Kyoto University (KYO). Hotta described the species in 1966, naming it after Mount Mulu, to which it was thought to be endemic. The description did not cover the lower pitchers of this species, which were unknown at the time. It was the first Nepenthes species to be described in 26 years (after N. densiflora in 1940) and the first since the end of World War II. At this time the genus was experiencing a revival in global interest, thanks largely to the work of Shigeo Kurata.

Nepenthes muluensis has been misidentified at least once in the literature; Bertram Evelyn Smythies identified specimens of N. muluensis as belonging to N. gracillima, a species endemic to Peninsular Malaysia.

This misidentification was published in 1965 in the proceedings of the UNESCO Humid Tropics Symposium, which was held in Kuching two years earlier.

== Description ==
Nepenthes muluensis is a climbing plant. The stem may attain a length of 4 m and is up to 5 mm in diameter. Internodes are cylindrical in cross section and up to 8 cm long.

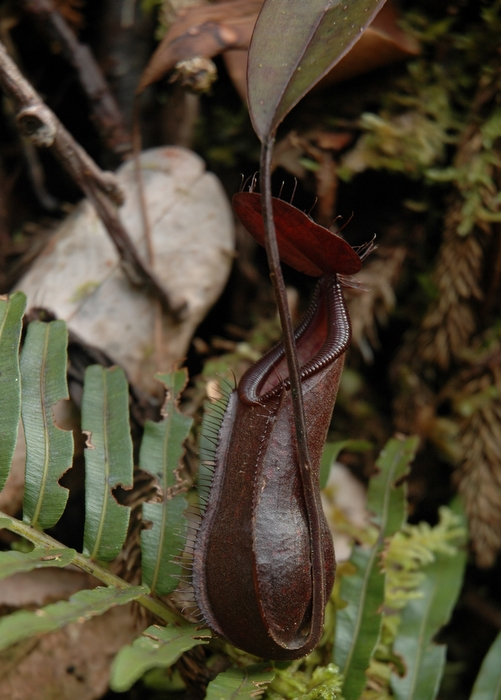
A lower pitcher

The leaves of this species are coriaceous (leathery) and sessile. The lamina (leaf blade) is lanceolate in shape and up to 8 cm long by 1.5 cm wide. It usually has an acute apex and is gradually thinned towards the base, extending into an amplexicaul sheath, meaning the base of the leaf is dilated and clasping the stem. Up to 4 longitudinal veins are present on either side of the midrib. Pinnate veins are numerous but indistinct. Tendrils are up to 8 cm long.

Rosette and lower pitchers are up to 7 cm high and 3 cm wide. They are ovate in the lower third, becoming cylindrical or conical above. The peristome, which is the ring of tissue surrounding the entrance to the plant's digestive tube, is approximately cylindrical and up to 5 mm wide. Its inner margin is lined with small but distinct 'teeth'. The pitcher mouth is round to ovate and has an oblique insertion. The lid or operculum is ovate and generally obtuse. It bears a number of filiform appendages (≤5 mm long) on its upper surface.

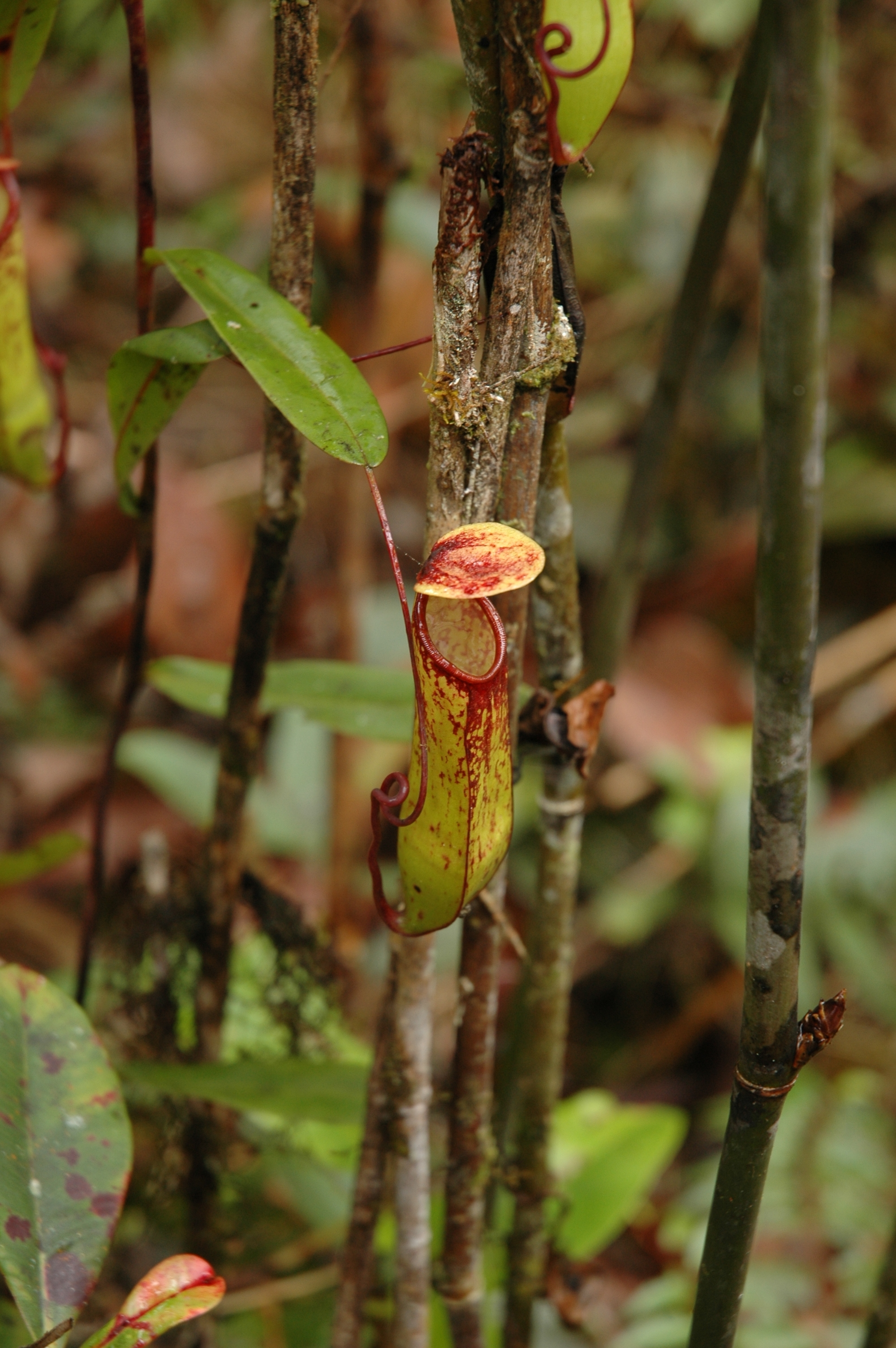
A typical upper pitcher from Mount Murud

Upper pitchers are cylindrical for the most part, often with a bulbous basal quarter. Like their lower counterparts, they are relatively small, reaching only 10 cm in height and 2 cm in width. They have a pair of ribs in place of wings. The waxy zone of the inner surface is well developed. The pitcher mouth is round and bears a cylindrical peristome up to 3 mm wide. The lid is orbicular and lacks appendages. An unbranched spur is inserted near the base of the lid.

Nepenthes muluensis has a racemose inflorescence. It is very compact: the peduncle is only up to 3 cm long, while the attenuate rachis reaches 10 cm in length. Pedicels are up to 5 mm long and lack bracts. Sepals are ovate and up to 2 mm long. A study of 120 pollen samples taken from two herbarium specimens (J.H.Adam 2401 and J.H.Adam 2405) found the mean pollen diameter to be 32.0 μm (SE = 0.4; CV = 8.7%).

The species completely lacks an indumentum, with all parts of the plant being glabrous.

The type population of N. muluensis from Mount Mulu has a distinctive pitcher colouration. Lower pitchers are generally dark purple with sparse yellow speckles. The upper pitchers of this form are usually purple with numerous yellowish-white speckles. They often have a white peristome and lid. Plants from Mount Murud produce darker-coloured pitchers.

== Ecology ==
As its name suggests, N. muluensis was originally known only from Mount Mulu. Since its description it has also been found on several other mountains in Sarawak (including Mount Api, Mount Murud, and Bukit Batu Lawi) and one in southwestern Sabah. Nepenthes muluensis has not been recorded from the nearby summit of Mount Benarat, although this is a limestone peak and mostly lies outside the known altitudinal distribution of the species, which is 1,700 to 2,400 m above sea level.

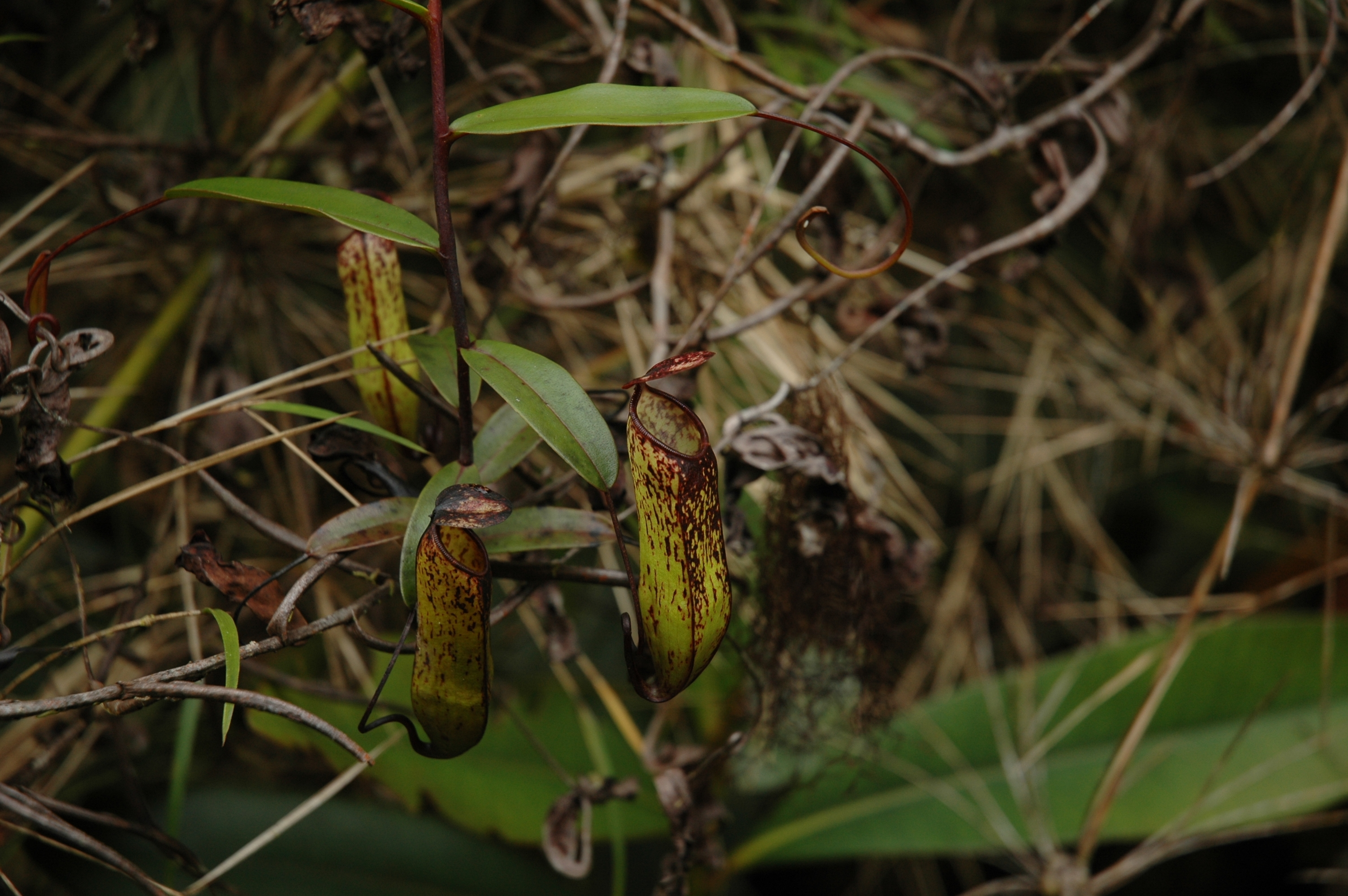
A climbing stem with upper pitchers

Nepenthes muluensis grows in nutrient-deficient soils of the upper montane zone. It typically occurs in open areas of mossy forest amongst ridge-top vegetation. On Mount Mulu, the species seems to be restricted to the western ridge and occurs from an elevation of around 1,900 m to the summit at 2,376 m. The summit vegetation is greatly stunted, rarely exceeding a metre in height. It is dominated by rhododendrons (particularly Rhododendron ericoides), as well as species of the genera Diplycosia and Vaccinium. Nepenthes muluensis is most abundant in summit heath forest, where it forms dense stands with hundreds of white-speckled pitchers suspended over the sympatric shrubs.

On Mount Murud, N. muluensis grows in shady mossy forest. This population produces darker pitchers than the one from Mount Mulu, possibly due to greater exposure to ultraviolet light at higher altitudes. Two true toad species from Mount Murud, Pelophryne linanitensis and Pelophryne murudensis, are sympatric with N. muluensis and may breed in its pitchers.

The conservation status of N. muluensis is listed as Least concern on the IUCN Red List based on a 2018 assessment. This differs from prior assessments made by the World Conservation Monitoring Centre: in 2000 as Vulnerable and in 1995 as Endangered. In 1997, Charles Clarke informally classified the species as Endangered based on the IUCN criteria, noting that it is Conservation Dependent if populations in protected areas are taken into account.

== Related species ==
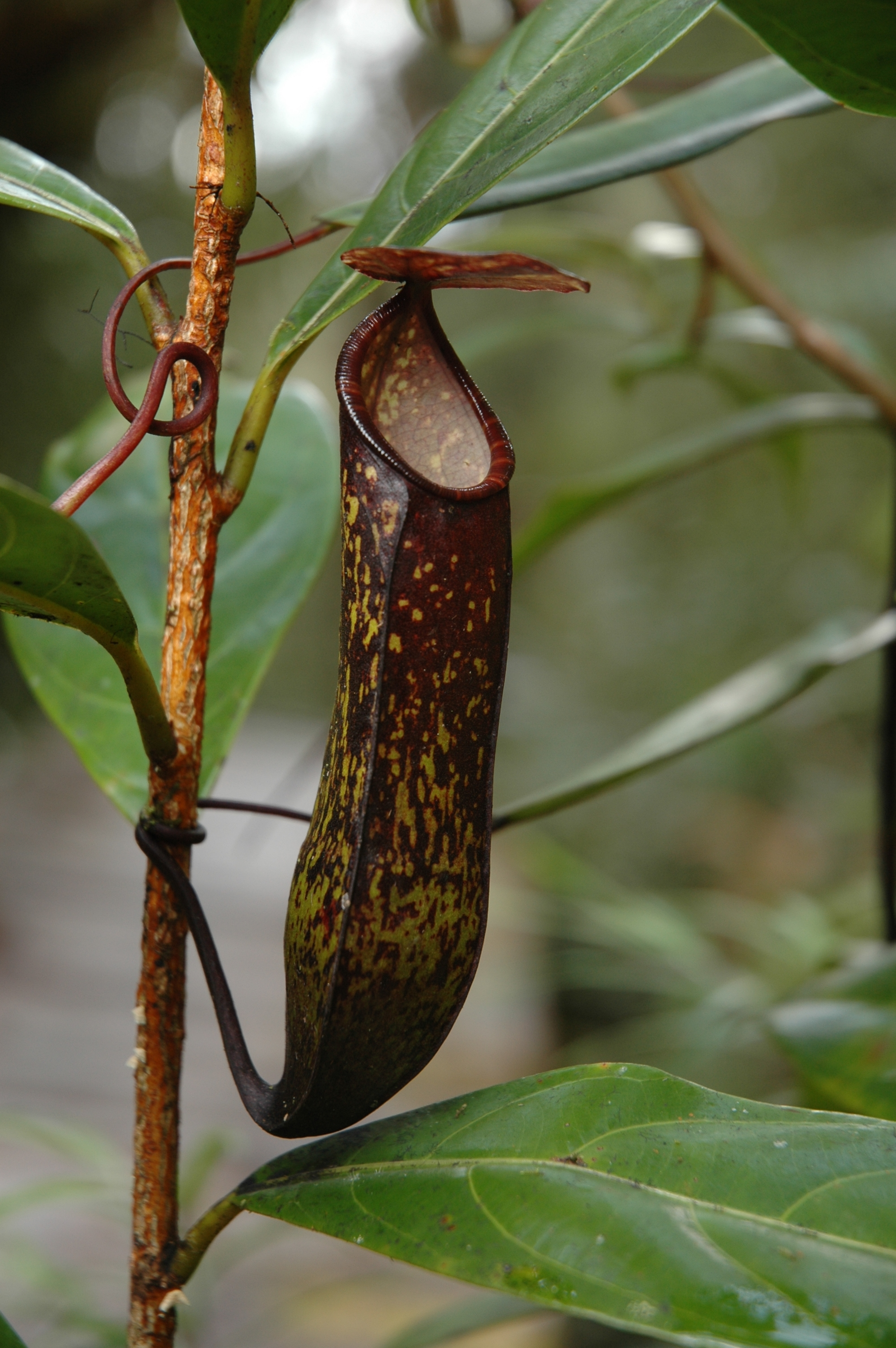
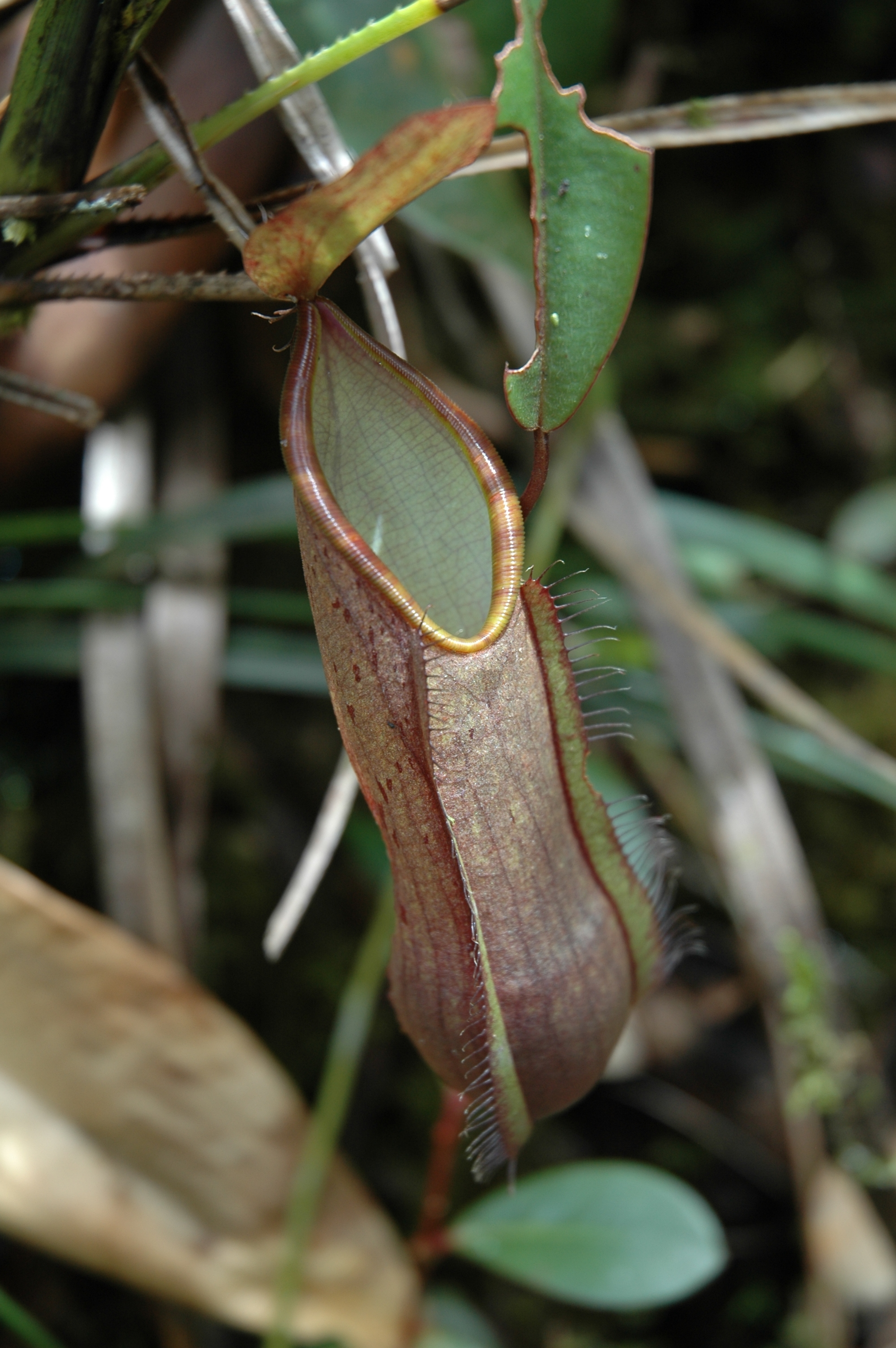
An upper pitcher of N. muluensis from Mount Murud (left) and an upper pitcher of N. tentaculata from Mount Api (right)

Nepenthes muluensis belongs to what has been called the "Hamata group", which also includes four other closely related species from Borneo and Sulawesi: N. glabrata, N. hamata, N. murudensis, and N. tentaculata. More recently, N. nigra has joined this group of related taxa.

Nepenthes muluensis is most easily confused with N. tentaculata. The lower pitchers of these species are almost identical, but those of N. muluensis have a rounder mouth. The climbing stem, growth habit and leaves are also similar, although N. muluensis usually has a narrower lamina. However, the upper pitchers of N. muluensis are distinctive; they usually have a white lid, a round mouth, and their wings are either greatly reduced or absent altogether.

== Natural hybrids ==
Two natural hybrids involving N. muluensis have been recorded: N. lowii × N. muluensis and N. muluensis × N. tentaculata.

=== Nepenthes × sarawakensis ===
Nepenthes muluensis × N. tentaculata was described as N. × sarawakiensis in 1993 by J. H. Adam, C. C. Wilcock, and M. D. Swaine. The authors distinguished the taxon from N. muluensis on the basis of its branched spur and the presence of fringe hairs on the top of the lid. They also compared the distribution of phenolic compounds in the leaves of N. muluensis and the hybrid, although they did so without specifying the number of plants studied or the number of repetitions performed. As a result, doubts have been raised over the existence of this hybrid. Charles Clarke writes that the authors described N. × sarawakiensis "in such a way that their work cannot be easily repeated". Although this natural hybrid is likely to exist, it is possible that N. × sarawakiensis was described based on specimens of N. muluensis with lower pitchers.

Distribution of phenolic compounds and leucoanthocyanins in N. muluensis, N. tentaculata, and N. × sarawakiensis
Taxon	1	2	3	4	5	6	7	8	Specimen
N. muluensis	-	+	++	+	+	-	3+	-	Jumaat 2400
N. tentaculata	+	+	-	±	-	+	-	-	Jumaat 2392
N. × sarawakiensis	+	+	+	+	+	+	3+	-	
N. × sarawakiensis (in vitro)	+	+	+	+	+	+	++	-	
Key: 1: Phenolic acid, 2: Ellagic acid, 3: Quercetin, 4: Kaempferol, 5: Luteolin, 6: 'Unknown Flavonoid 1', 7: 'Unknown Flavonoid 3', 8: Cyanidin ±: very weak spot, +: weak spot, ++: strong spot, 3+: very strong spot, -: absent

In 2002, phytochemical screening and analytical chromatography were used to study the presence of phenolic compounds and leucoanthocyanins in N. × sarawakiensis and its putative parent species. The research was based on leaf material from dry herbarium specimens. Eight spots containing phenolic acids, flavonols, flavones, leucoanthocyanins and 'unknown flavonoids' 1 and 3 were identified from chromatographic profiles. The distributions of these in N. × sarawakiensis, N. muluensis and N. tentaculata are shown in the adjacent table. A specimen of N. × sarawakiensis grown from tissue culture (in vitro) was also tested.

Phenolic acid, 'Unknown Flavonoid 1' and cyanidin were undetected in N. muluensis, while N. tentaculata lacked quercetin, luteolin, 'Unknown Flavonoid 3', and cyanidin. Chromatographic patterns of the N. × sarawakiensis samples studied showed complementation of its putative parental species.

Myricetin was found to be absent from all studied taxa. This agrees with the findings of previous authors and suggests that the absence of a widely distributed compound like myricetin among the Nepenthes examined might provide additional diagnostic information for these taxa.
