= Mount Mulu =

Mountain in Sarawak, Malaysia

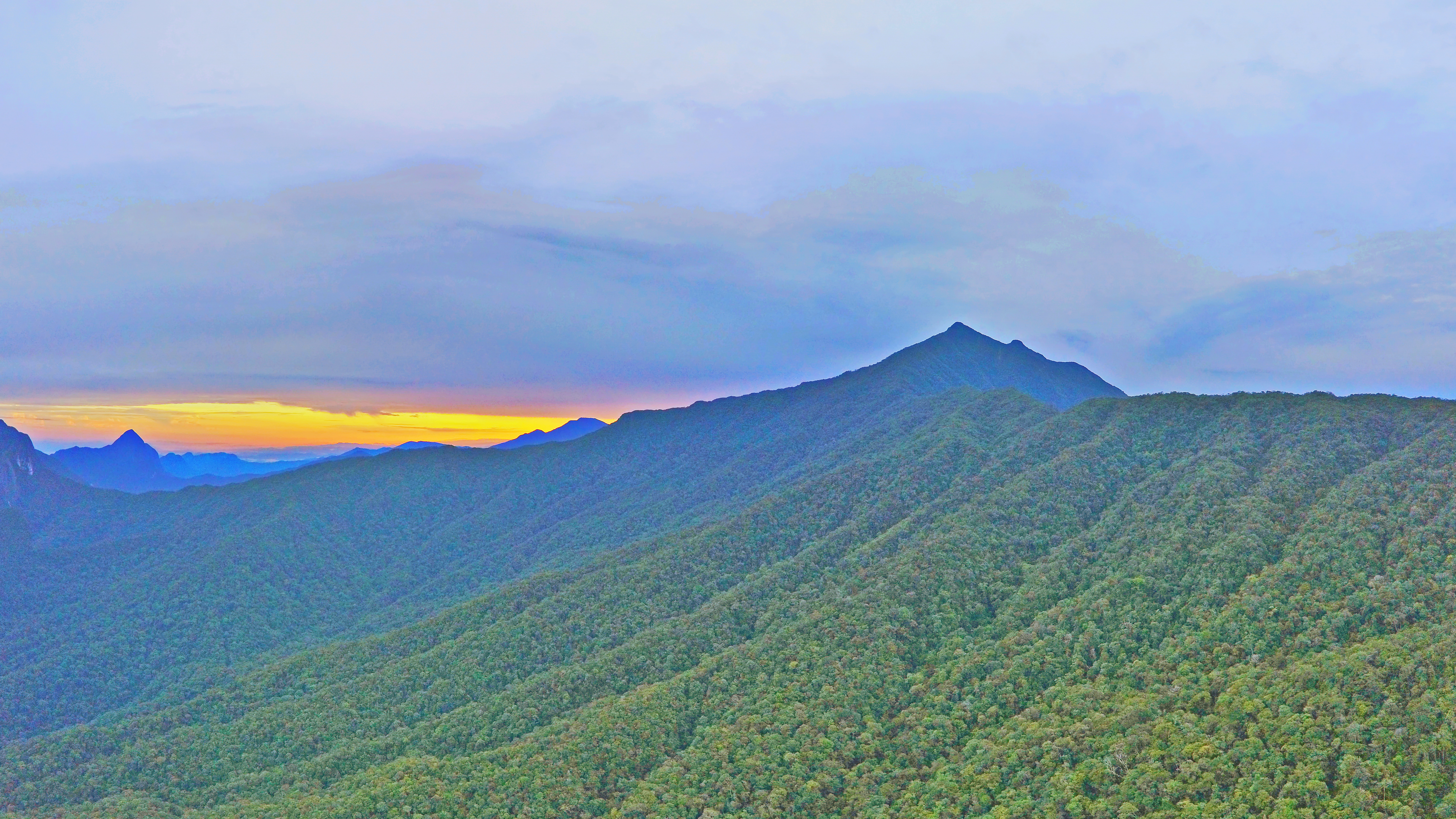
- Mount Mulu Summit in the evening

Highest point
- Elevation: 2,376 m (7,795 ft)
- Prominence: 2,025 m (6,644 ft)
- Listing: Ultra; Ribu
- Coordinates: 4.05°N 114.933°E

Naming
- Native name: Gunung Mulu (Malay)

Geography
- Location within Malaysia
- Location: Miri Division, Sarawak, Malaysia

Mount Mulu (Malay: Gunung Mulu) is a sandstone and shale mountain. At 2376 m, it is the second highest mountain in the state of Sarawak, after Mount Murud. It is located within the boundaries of Gunung Mulu National Park, which is named after it.

== History ==
In the 19th century, Spenser St. John and Charles Hose attempted to conquer Mount Mulu. However, their attempts failed. Only in the 1920s did a Berawan rhino hunter named Tama Nilong discover the south-west ridge near the mountain which eventually led to the summit. In 1932, Tama Nilong led Lord Shackleton and an Oxford University Expedition to the summit of Mount Mulu.

== Climbing route ==
There is only one trek leading to the summit of Mount Mulu. The summit is located at 24 km away from the park headquarters. The trek starts from the national park headquarters to reach Camp 3. It is a 12 km hike through the primary forests with an elevation of 1,200 metres. The mossy forest starts from Camp 3. It will be a few hours to climb to reach Camp 4. After Camp 4, there are a few vertical climbs which requires knotted ropes which eventually leads to the summit. Camp 1 is located along the descending trek from the summit of Mount Mulu. There is another 3-hour hike to reach the park headquarters from Camp 1.

== Biodiversity ==
Mulu's limestone karst and isolated mountain peaks are home to many unique and endangered plants and animals. The mountain has biological systems range from lowland dipterocarp forest to montane vegetations. The mountain is notable for its pitcher plant diversity. Five species have been recorded from Mount Mulu: Nepenthes hurrelliana, Nepenthes lowii, Nepenthes muluensis, Nepenthes tentaculata, and Nepenthes vogelii.

== See also ==
- List of ultras of the Malay Archipelago
