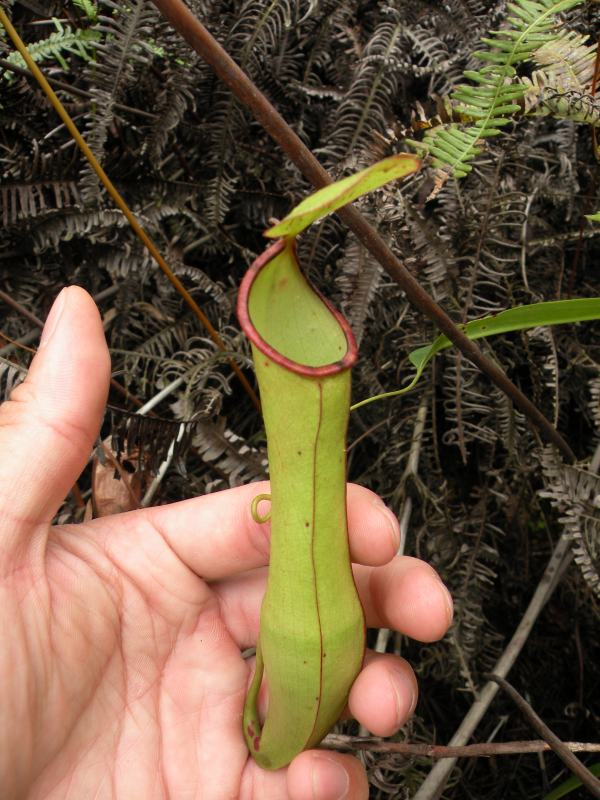
- An upper pitcher of N. × sharifah-hapsahii from Pahang, Peninsular Malaysia

Scientific classification
- Kingdom: Plantae
- Clade: Tracheophytes
- Clade: Angiosperms
- Clade: Eudicots
- Order: Caryophyllales
- Family: Nepenthaceae
- Genus: Nepenthes
- Species: N. × sharifah-hapsahii

Binomial name
- Nepenthes × sharifah-hapsahii J.H.Adam & Hafiza (2007)

Synonyms
- Synonyms: Nepenthes ghazallyana J.H.Adam, Wilcock & Swaine (1992) nom.nud.; Nepenthes ghazallyiana J.H.Adam, Wilcock & Swaine (1992) nom.nud. [original spelling]; Nepenthes grabilis Hort. Westphal (1991) nom.nud.; ?Nepenthes neglecta Macfarl. (1908); Nepenthes neglecta auct. non Macfarl.: Y.Fukatsu (1999)

= Nepenthes × sharifah-hapsahii =

Species of carnivorous plant

Nepenthes × sharifah-hapsahii (/nɪˈpɛnθiːz ʃɑːˈriːfə hɑːpˈsɑːiaɪ/) is a natural hybrid between N. gracilis and N. mirabilis. It has been recorded from Borneo, Peninsular Malaysia, Sumatra, and Thailand, although it was originally described as a species (N. sharifah-hapsahii) endemic to Peninsular Malaysia, where it was said to grow at elevations below 1000 m.

The type material of N. × sharifah-hapsahii was collected by J. H. Adam on the grounds of the Universiti Kebangsaan Malaysia campus on August 2, 2001. Both the holotype (JHA 8000) and isotype are deposited at the university's herbarium. The taxon was named after the Universiti Kebangsaan Malaysia Vice Chancellor, Professor Dato' Dr. Sharifah Hapsah Syed Hasan Shahabudin.

Nepenthes × ghazallyana (/nɪˈpɛnθiːz ɡəˌzɑːliːˈænə/, after Ghazally Ismail) is a heterotypic synonym of N. × sharifah-hapsahii.

== Description ==
The stem of this hybrid is cylindrical, glabrous, and may climb to a height of 5 m. Leaves are leathery in texture, lanceolate or oblong in morphology, and 9 to 20 cm long. Tendrils may be up to 20 cm long. Pitchers are infundibulate in the lower and upper portions and tubular in the middle. They measure up to 15 cm in height and 3.5 cm in width. The peristome is cylindrical and 1 to 2 mm thick. It bears distinct inner teeth and ribs. The lid is orbiculate and covered with numerous glands on the lower surface. N. × sharifah-hapsahii has a racemose inflorescence, the axis of which is 30 to 35 cm long. The female inflorescence is unknown at present.

== Identification ==
Nepenthes × sharifah-hapsahii most closely resembles N. gracilis. The table below shows characters that distinguish these two taxa, according to Adam and Hafiza.

Morphological characters	Nepenthes × sharifah-hapsahii	Nepenthes gracilis
Shape of upper stem	Cylindrical	Triangular or angular
Lamina base	Attenuate into petiole like region and the base not decurrent but clasping stem for about half its circumference	Not attenuate into petiole like region and the base decurrent, wings extend almost over one internode
Distribution of nectar glands on lower lid surface	Numerous nectar glands distributed all over lower lid surface	Nectar glands scarcely distributed on lower lid surface
Type of digestive glands on inner wall cavity of pitcher	Overarched glands: prominently covered by extended epidermal roof conceal more than half of the glands	Exposed glands: epidermal roof covering digestive glands poorly developed exposed almost all part of the glands
Peristome ribs	Distinct	Inconspicuous
Pedicels	2-flowered on lower 2/3 and 1-flowered on upper 1/3 part of male raceme	All 1-flowered

Adam and Hafiza also noted that N. × sharifah-hapsahii is somewhat similar to N. tobaica, from which it differs in several aspects of leaf and inflorescence morphology. Unlike N. tobaica, N. × sharifah-hapsahii has overarched glands on the inner pitcher wall, one-flowered pedicels on the upper third of the male raceme, and numerous longitudinal veins on the lamina.
