= Mount Ilas Bungaan =

Hill near Berau, Borneo, Indonesia

Highest point
- Elevation: c. 300 m (984 ft)

Geography
- Location: Berau, East Kalimantan, Borneo

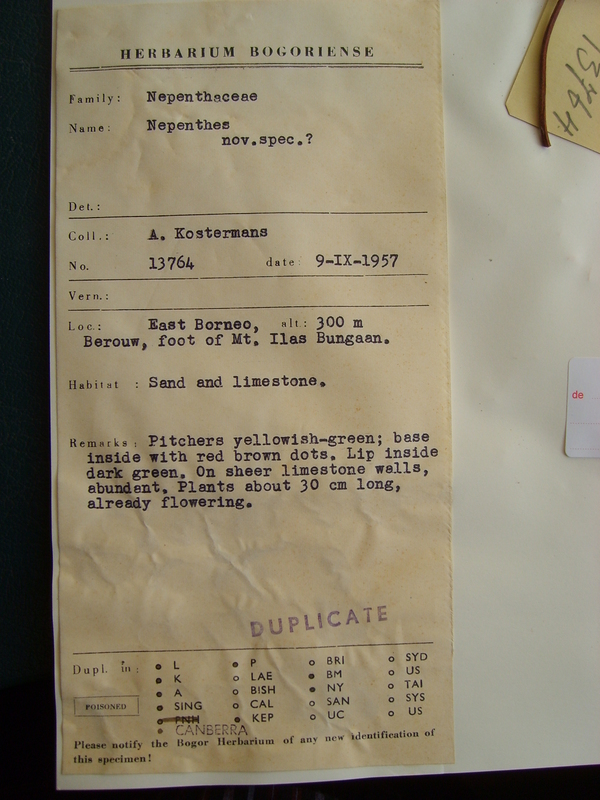
Herbarium label from one of Kostermans's original sheets of N. campanulata

Mount Ilas Bungaan (Indonesian: Gunung Ilas Bungaan) is a limestone hill near Berau, East Kalimantan, Borneo. It is also known as Flowering Rock, a literal translation of its Indonesian name (ilas = rock, bungaan = flowering). The hill is located "on a remote stretch of the Karangan River" and its base lies at an altitude of around 300 m.

Botanist A. J. G. Kostermans explored Mount Ilas Bungaan between September 8 and September 19, 1957, as part of an expedition to northeastern Borneo. During this time, Kostermans made the first known collection of the rare pitcher plant Nepenthes campanulata, which grew on the "sand and limestone walls" of the hill's 100 m high rock face. He wrote the following account of his discovery:

I was working for the Forestry Department at that time in Sangkulirang and when I had finished I wanted to find out about a flowering rock, Ilas Bungaan, upriver. After 10 days walking I saw the yellowish rock for the first time. When we were there we discovered that the yellow colour was that of the leaves of a Nepenthes completely covering the steep face of the 50 m high rock. We cut a tree that fell to the rock and acted as a ladder and climbed up. The Nepenthes was not in flower or fruit, but we found caves in the rock and in the caves a couple of boat-like coffins with sculptured dog-head ends which contained decapitated skeletons.

The population of N. campanulata originally discovered on Mount Ilas Bungaan was destroyed during the widespread Borneo forest fires of 1983–1984 and the species is thus locally extinct. It has since been rediscovered in Gunung Mulu National Park in Sarawak, more than 400 km from Mount Ilas Bungaan.
