= Mount Ilas Mapulu =

Mountain near Berau, Borneo, Indonesia

Highest point
- Elevation: c. 800 m (2,625 ft)

Geography
- Location: Berau, East Kalimantan, Borneo

Mount Ilas Mapulu (Indonesian: Gunung Ilas Mapulu) is a limestone mountain near Berau, East Kalimantan, Borneo. It is the type locality of the pitcher plant species Nepenthes mapuluensis, which is named after it.
