= Nepenthes × sarawakiensis =

Scientific classification
- Kingdom: Plantae
- Clade: Tracheophytes
- Clade: Angiosperms
- Clade: Eudicots
- Order: Caryophyllales
- Family: Nepenthaceae
- Genus: Nepenthes
- Species: N. × sarawakiensis

Binomial name
- Nepenthes × sarawakiensis J.H.Adam, Wilcock & Swaine (1993)

Synonyms
- N. × sarawakensis orth.var.

Species of carnivorous plant

Nepenthes × sarawakiensis (/nɪˈpɛnθiːz səˌrɑːwɑːkiˈɛnsɪs/, after Sarawak, Borneo) is a natural hybrid involving N. muluensis and N. tentaculata. It is quite a rare plant as one of its parent species, N. muluensis, is only known from several isolated mountains.
