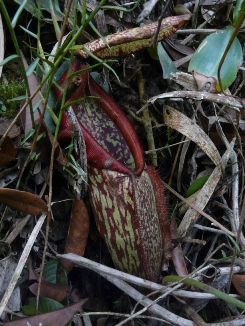
- Lower pitcher of N. mapuluensis, East Kalimantan, c. 650 m a.s.l.

Conservation status
- Endangered (IUCN 3.1)

Scientific classification
- Kingdom: Plantae
- Clade: Tracheophytes
- Clade: Angiosperms
- Clade: Eudicots
- Order: Caryophyllales
- Family: Nepenthaceae
- Genus: Nepenthes
- Species: N. mapuluensis

Binomial name
- Nepenthes mapuluensis J.H.Adam & Wilcock (1990)
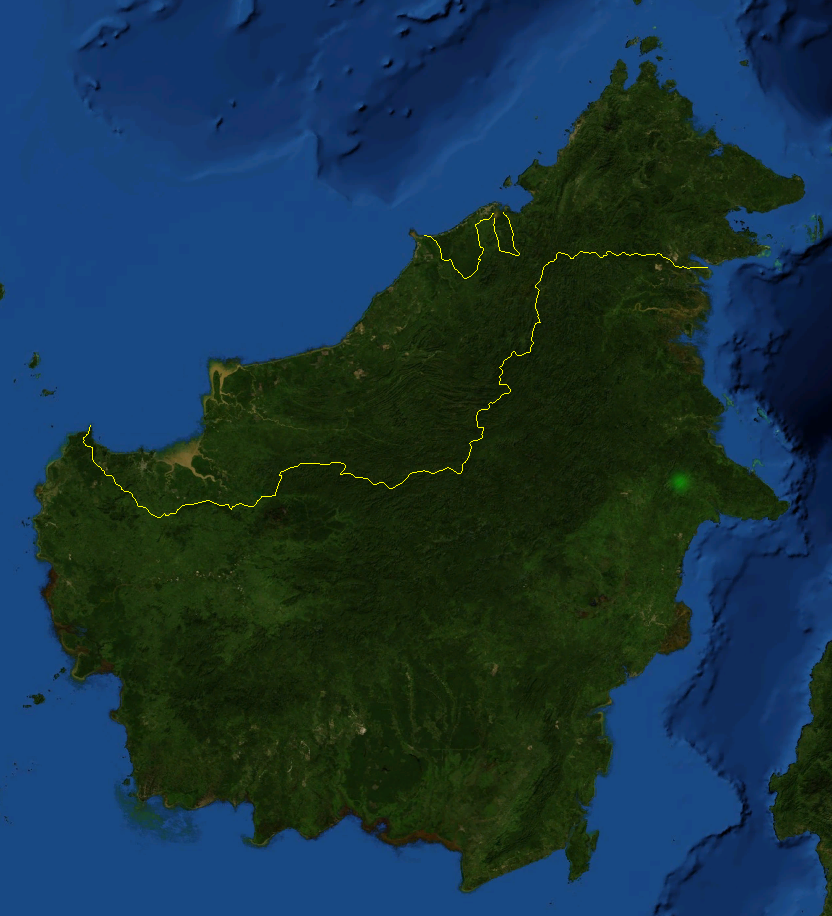
- Distribution of N. mapuluensis.

= Nepenthes mapuluensis =

Tropical pitcher plant endemic to Borneo

Nepenthes mapuluensis (/nɪˈpɛnθiːz məˌpuːluˈɛnsɪs/; from Mount Ilas Mapulu), the Mapulu pitcher-plant, is a species of tropical pitcher plant native to East Kalimantan, Borneo. It is known only from a restricted geographical range and is listed as Endangered on the IUCN Red List.

Nepenthes mapuluensis has no known natural hybrids. No infraspecific taxa have been described.

== Botanical history ==
Nepenthes mapuluensis was first collected in 1957^{[note a]} on Mount Ilas Mapulu by A.J.G. 'Doc' Kostermans, the head of the Botanical Division of the Forestry Research Institute at Bogor, on the same expedition in which he collected the type material of N. campanulata. The species was described in 1990 by J. H. Adam and C. C. Wilcock based on a single duplicate collection in the Leiden and Bogor herbaria, designated as Kostermans 14017.

== Description ==
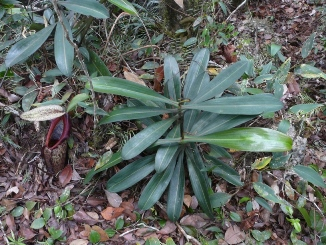
Rosette plant (the lower pitcher belongs to a nearby growing plant), c. 650 m a.s.l.

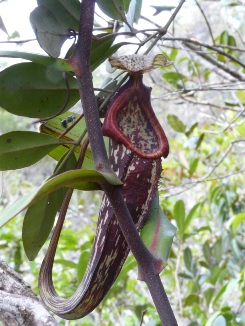
Upper pitcher, c. 650 m a.s.l.

The stem of N. mapuluensis can measure up to 6 mm in diameter, but the maximum length is unknown. Internodes are cylindrical and up to 4 cm long. The leaves are coriaceous. The lamina is oblanceolate-linear in morphology, up to 26 cm long, and 5 cm wide. The apex of the lamina is acute, while the base is attenuate, sub-petiolate, and semi-amplexicaul. Tendrils grow to 50 cm in length.

The pitchers of N. mapuluensis are ellipsoidal in shape. They grow to 21 cm in height and 8.5 cm in diameter. The pitchers possess two fringed wings up to 10 mm wide. The peristome of this species is moderately developed and is folded or wavy as in the closely related N. northiana. The peristome may be up to 12 mm wide and bears a row of distinct, but not pronounced, teeth. Aerial or upper pitchers may be infundibular throughout, but are often cylindrical and relatively small. They bear reduced fringed wings or ribs.

Nepenthes mapuluensis has a racemose inflorescence. The peduncle is up to 7 cm long. The size of the rachis is unknown. Pedicels grow to 8 mm in length. A study of 120 pollen samples taken from the type specimen (Kostermans 14017) found the mean pollen diameter to be 28.9 μm (SE = 0.5; CV = 9.2%).

The species is mostly glabrous, although certain parts of the plant, such as the pitchers, may have a scattered indumentum of short hairs.

== Ecology ==
The type locality of N. mapuluensis is described on the original collector's label, which reads: "the species is common on the limestone mountain of Ilas Mapulu at an altitude of 800 m". The population from which the type specimen originated was subsequently destroyed and for some time the species was thought to be extinct. More recently, however, further observations of N. mapuluensis have been made by Troy Davis, Joachim Nerz and Andreas Wistuba, significantly expanding the known range of this species. This being the case, N. mapuluensis is thought to be endemic to the Sambaliung mountain range in East Kalimantan.

Nepenthes mapuluensis is restricted to limestone substrates and grows in stunted vegetation on low summit ridges, which are often extremely inaccessible. It has been recorded from elevations of between 50 and 850 m.

== Related species ==
Nepenthes mapuluensis is very similar to N. northiana and there is some question as to the validity of its species status. Although there are few morphological characters separating these two taxa, there seem to be several stable differences that can be used to distinguish between them. Compared to N. northiana, the leaves on the climbing stems of N. mapuluensis are more linear, the pitchers darker in colour, and the upper pitchers narrower. It is also worth noting that N. northiana is known only from the Bau area of Sarawak, which lies several hundred kilometres away from the only known populations of N. mapuluensis.

In his Carnivorous Plant Database, taxonomist Jan Schlauer treats N. mapuluensis as a possible synonym of N. northiana.

== Cultivation ==
Nepenthes mapuluensis is extremely rare in cultivation. It has been artificially crossed with N. ventricosa to produce the hybrid Nepenthes × mapulucosa Hort.Westphal in sched. (2000), although this name is a nomen nudum.

== Notes ==
a. Kostermans explored Mount Ilas Mapulu between September 20 and September 24, and it was during this time that he collected N. mapuluensis.
