= Mount Murud =

Mountain in Malaysia

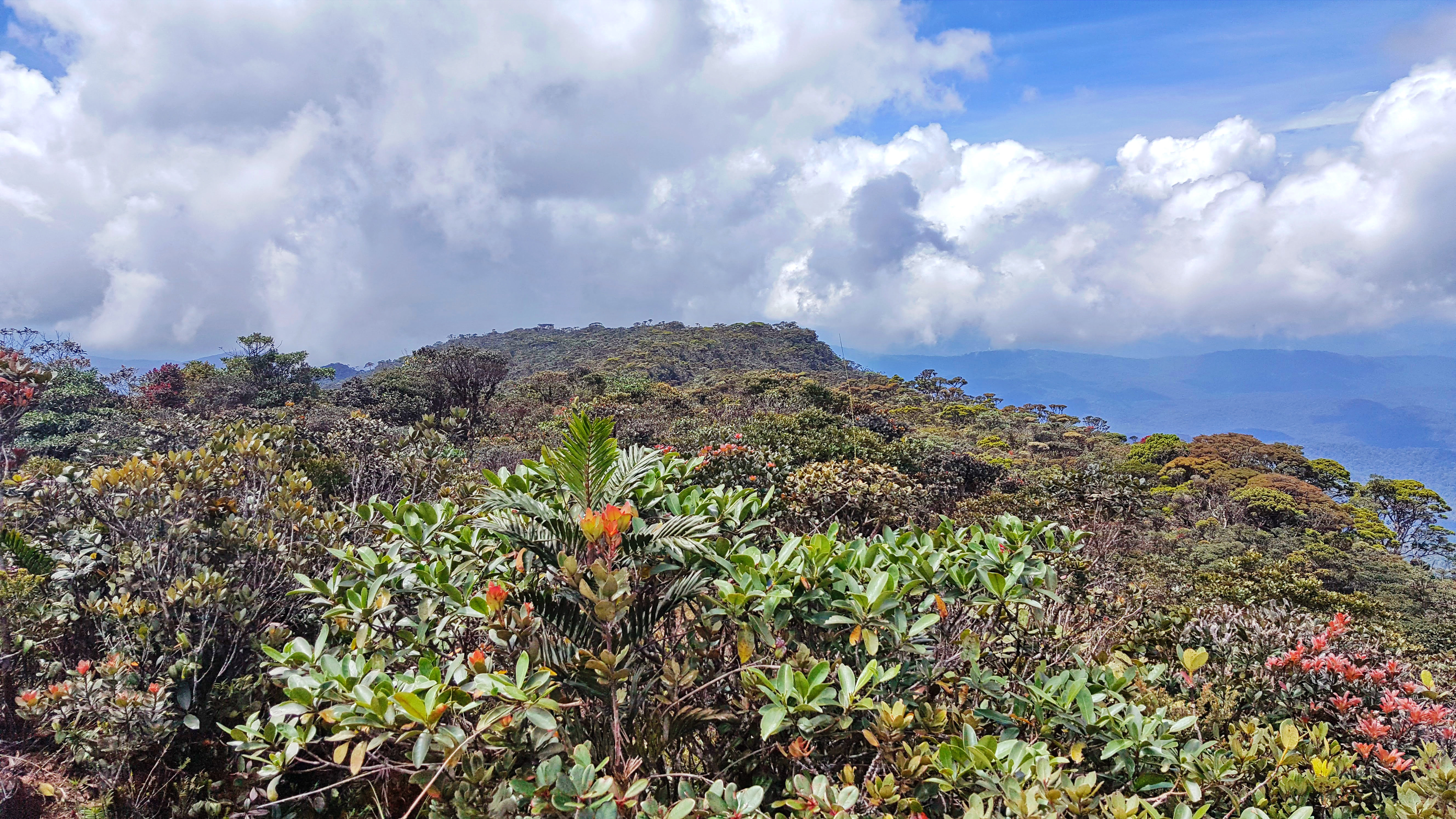
- Vegetation near the summit of Mount Murud

Highest point
- Elevation: 2,424 m (7,953 ft)
- Prominence: 1,967 m (6,453 ft)
- Listing: Ultra; Ribu
- Coordinates: 3°54′19″N 115°29′20″E

Naming
- Native name: Gunung Murud (Malay)

Geography
- Location: Limbang Division, Sarawak, Malaysia
- Parent range: Kelabit Highlands

Climbing
- First ascent: 1922 by Eric Mjöberg

Mount Murud or Muru (Malay: Gunung Murud) is a sandstone mountain located in Limbang Division, Sarawak, Malaysia At 2,424 m (7,946 ft), it is the highest mountain in Sarawak.

== Geography ==
Mount Murud at the elevation of 2,424 m, is the highest mountain in Sarawak, located at the boundary between Miri and Limbang Division, in the Kelabit Highlands. It is a white-yellowish sandstone mountain, formed during the Miocene Epoch, extends for 4 km long, running in the ENE-WSW direction. Mount Murud has two highest points, with one point higher than the other by only 15 m.

Mount Murud

Climate chart (precipitation, max. and min. temperature)
J	F	M	A	M	J	J	A	S	O	N	D
378 18 13	335 20 14	228 19 13	325 18 14	383 20 14	230 17 14	358 20 13	428 21 12	315 21 14	300 20 13	393 18 14	351 18 15
- █ Average max. and min. temperatures in °C
- █ Precipitation totals in mm
Imperial conversion
J	F	M	A	M	J	J	A	S	O	N	D
15 64 55	13 68 57	9 66 55	13 64 57	15 68 57	9.1 63 57	14 68 55	17 70 54	12 70 57	12 68 55	15 64 57	14 64 59
- █ Average max. and min. temperatures in °F
- █ Precipitation totals in inches

== History ==
According to a local legend, there was once a penghulu (headman) named Baya Kalong who stayed near the present-day Mount Murud area. He had a beautiful daughter named Kelawing. Kelawing was later married to another young penghulu named Tingang who came from another longhouse. However, Tingang's younger brother named Lawi became jealous of his brother and beheaded Kelawing while the couple was walking upstairs into longhouse. Tingang became angry and tried to kill his brother. Then, their father's sound came from heaven who condemn them for breaking their promise of not fighting each other. After that, a severe thunderstorm came and buried Tingang's longhouse with all its inhabitants with stones raining from the sky. The piles of stones later formed Mount Murud.

The first attempt to climb Mount Murud was made in 1914 by John Coney Moulton, curator of Sarawak State Museum, but failed due to food shortage and killings of their native guides from a Dayak Lun Bawang invasion. He made a second attempt to climb the mountain in 1920 but failed again. The first successful ascent of Mount Murud was by a Swedish zoologist who was also a curator of Sarawak State Museum, Eric Mjöberg in October 1922. He spent six days at the summit of the mountain and collected various animal and plant species. His collections were documented by various authors in the third volume of Sarawak Museum Journal in 1928. Following this, his footsteps were followed by other botanical collectors in the 1960s and 1990s. During Indonesia-Malaysia confrontation, a Gurkha post was built at the summit. In the 1980s, a man from Ba'kelalan named Agung Bangau saw a vision to build a church there. A church was later built at a plateau on the mountain and the first prayer meeting was held in July 1985, attended by 600 people from the nearby villages of Ba'kelalan and Bario. Today, a village is built around the church completed with public amenities; receiving visitors around the world. It is regarded as a sacred mountain where smoking and alcoholic drinks are prohibited. Prayer meetings are held every two years by the Mount Murud Prayer Ministry. In 1995, Universiti Malaysia Sarawak (UNIMAS) organised an expedition to Mount Murud. During the expedition, a species of Vanilla orchid named Vanilla kinabaluensis, Rafflesia pricei, and slipper orchid Paphiopedilum were discovered. A total of 70 samples were collected by the UNIMAS expedition team.

== Biodiversity ==
The UNIMAS expedition team defined the animal and plant species collected from 1,500 m to 1,800 m range above sea level as species originating from the Mount Murud; because specimens collected below this level can originate from the mountain surroundings. Mjöberg noted in 1925 that nine species of birds that were previously known as originated from Mount Kinabalu are also found at Mount Murud. This is supported by another evidence that 77% of Pteridophyte and 75% of orchids are common in both mountains. However, despite the close proximity of Mount Murud with Mount Mulu (65 km WSW of Mount Murud), both mountains have different summit flora. As of 1995, a total of 35 pteridophytes, 7 gymnosperms, 96 monocotyledons, and 207 dicotyledons were listed as summit flora of Mount Murud. The tropical pitcher plant species Nepenthes murudensis is named after the mountain and is thought to be endemic to its summit area. Also Murud black slender toad Ansonia vidua is only known from this mountain.

== See also ==
- List of ultras of the Malay Archipelago
