= Jumaat Haji Adam =

Botanist

Jumaat Haji Adam (born 1956) is a botanist and taxonomist specialising in the carnivorous pitcher plant genus Nepenthes.

Adam has described numerous Nepenthes taxa, mostly with C. C. Wilcock, including the species N. faizaliana and N. mapuluensis, as well as the natural hybrids N. × alisaputrana, N. × sarawakiensis, and N. × sharifah-hapsahii.
