= C. C. Wilcock =

Christopher C. Wilcock (born 1946) is a taxonomist specialising in the carnivorous pitcher plant genus Nepenthes.

Together with J. H. Adam, Wilcock has described several Nepenthes taxa, including the species N. faizaliana and N. mapuluensis, as well as the natural hybrids N. × alisaputrana and N. × sarawakiensis.
