= List of Nepenthes clades =

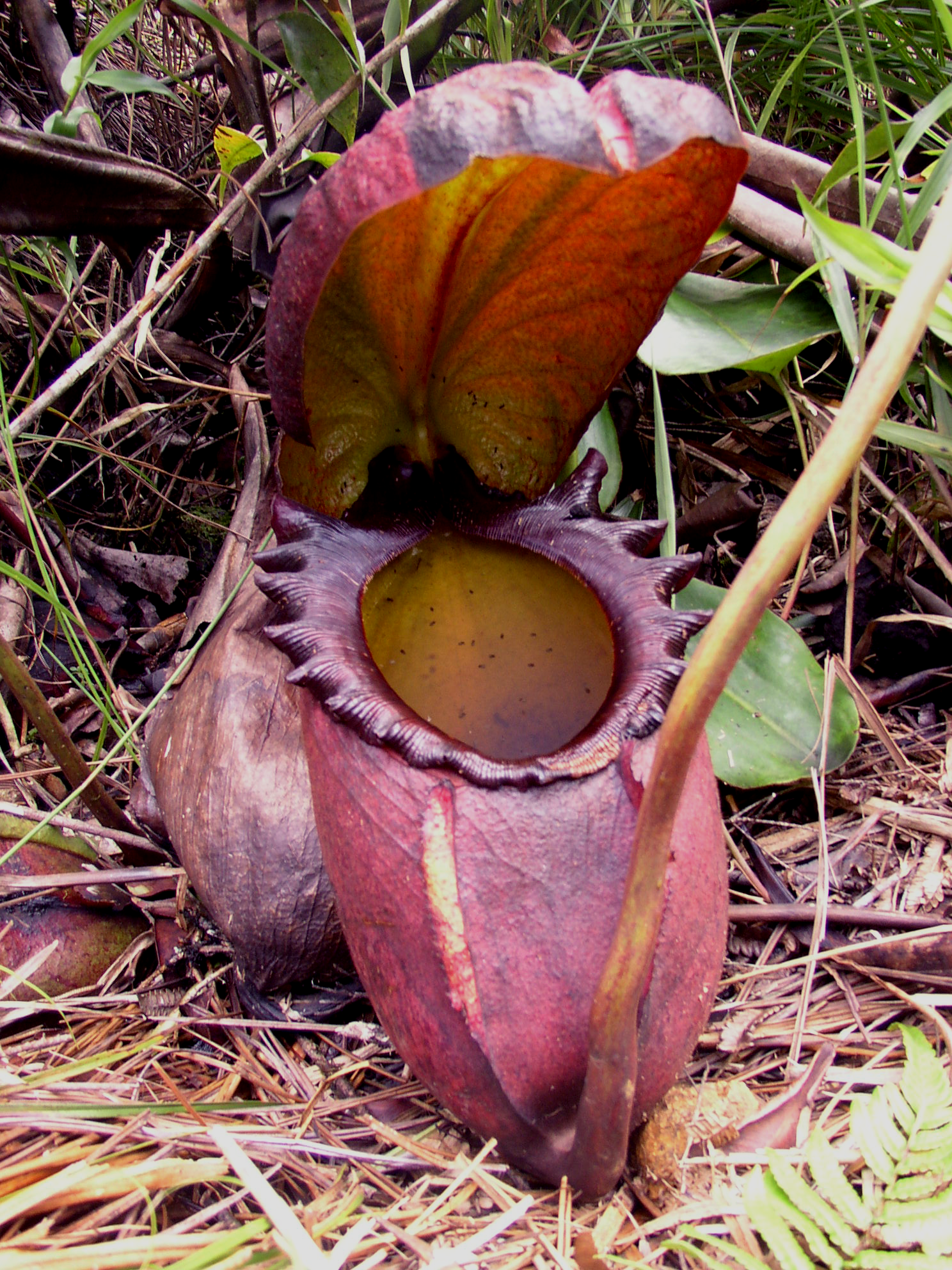
Danser placed Nepenthes rajah in the clade Regiae.

The taxonomy of Nepenthes has been revised several times during the nineteenth and twentieth centuries.

== Nineteenth century ==
The first subgeneric division of the Nepenthes was made by Joseph Dalton Hooker in his 1873 monograph, "Nepenthaceae". Hooker distinguished N. pervillei from all other taxa based on its seeds, which lack the appendages typical of most Nepenthes. He placed it in the monotypic section Anourosperma. All other species were subsumed in the second section, Eunepenthes.

A second attempt to establish a natural subdivision within the genus was made in 1895 by Günther Beck von Mannagetta und Lerchenau in "Die Gattung Nepenthes". Beck kept the two sections created by Hooker, but divided Eunepenthes into three subgroups: Apruinosae, Pruinosae, and Retiferae.

== Twentieth century ==
Nepenthes taxonomy was once again revised in 1908 by John Muirhead Macfarlane in his own monograph. Oddly, Macfarlane did not name the groups he distinguished. His revision is generally not considered to be a natural division of the genus.

In 1928, B. H. Danser published his seminal monograph, "The Nepenthaceae of the Netherlands Indies", in which he divided Nepenthes into six clades, based on observations of herbarium material. The clades were: the Vulgatae, Montanae, Nobiles, Regiae, Insignes and Urceolatae. Regiae appears to reflect the relationships of its members quite well, although the same cannot be said for the other clades. Despite this, Danser's classification was undoubtedly a great improvement on previous attempts.

Danser classified Nepenthes as follows:

Vulgatae

- N. distillatoria
- N. tomoriana
- N. neoguineensis
- N. mirabilis
- N. madagascariensis
- N. tobaica
- N. anamensis *
- N. papuana
- N. khasiana
- N. gracilis
- N. paniculata
- N. reinwardtiana
- N. pervillei
- N. thorelii
- N. kampotiana
- N. alata
- N. philippinensis
- N. trichocarpa **
- N. tentaculata
- N. albomarginata
- N. vieillardii
- N. geoffrayi *

Montanae

- N. gymnamphora
- N. pectinata *
- N. bongso
- N. gracillima
- N. sanguinea
- N. macfarlanei
- N. singalana
- N. inermis
- N. dubia
- N. carunculata *

Nobiles

- N. spectabilis
- N. leptochila *
- N. hirsuta
- N. deaniana
- N. neglecta **

Regiae

- N. maxima
- N. oblanceolata *
- N. veitchii
- N. ephippiata
- N. klossii
- N. pilosa
- N. burbidgeae
- N. rajah
- N. attenboroughii
- N. boschiana
- N. mollis
- N. clipeata
- N. truncata
- N. fusca
- N. stenophylla
- N. lowii

Insignes

- N. merrilliana
- N. petiolata
- N. burkei
- N. ventricosa
- N. northiana
- N. decurrens *
- N. treubiana
- N. villosa
- N. insignis
- N. rafflesiana

Urceolatae

- N. ampullaria
- N. bicalcarata
- N. hookeriana **

* Heterotypic synonyms of other species.
** Natural hybrids.

The taxonomic work of Danser (1928) was revised by Hermann Harms in 1936. Harms divided Nepenthes into three subgenera: Anourosperma Hook.f. (1873), Eunepenthes Hook.f. (1873) and Mesonepenthes Harms (1936) (Latin: meso: middle; "middle" Nepenthes). The Nepenthes species found in the subgenera Anourosperma and Mesonepenthes differ from those in the Vulgatae, where Danser had placed them. Harms placed the great majority of Nepenthes species in the Eunepenthes; Anourosperma was a monotypic subgenus, while Mesonepenthes contained only three species. He also created an additional clade, the Distillatoriae (after N. distillatoria).
