= Nepenthaceae (1873 monograph) =

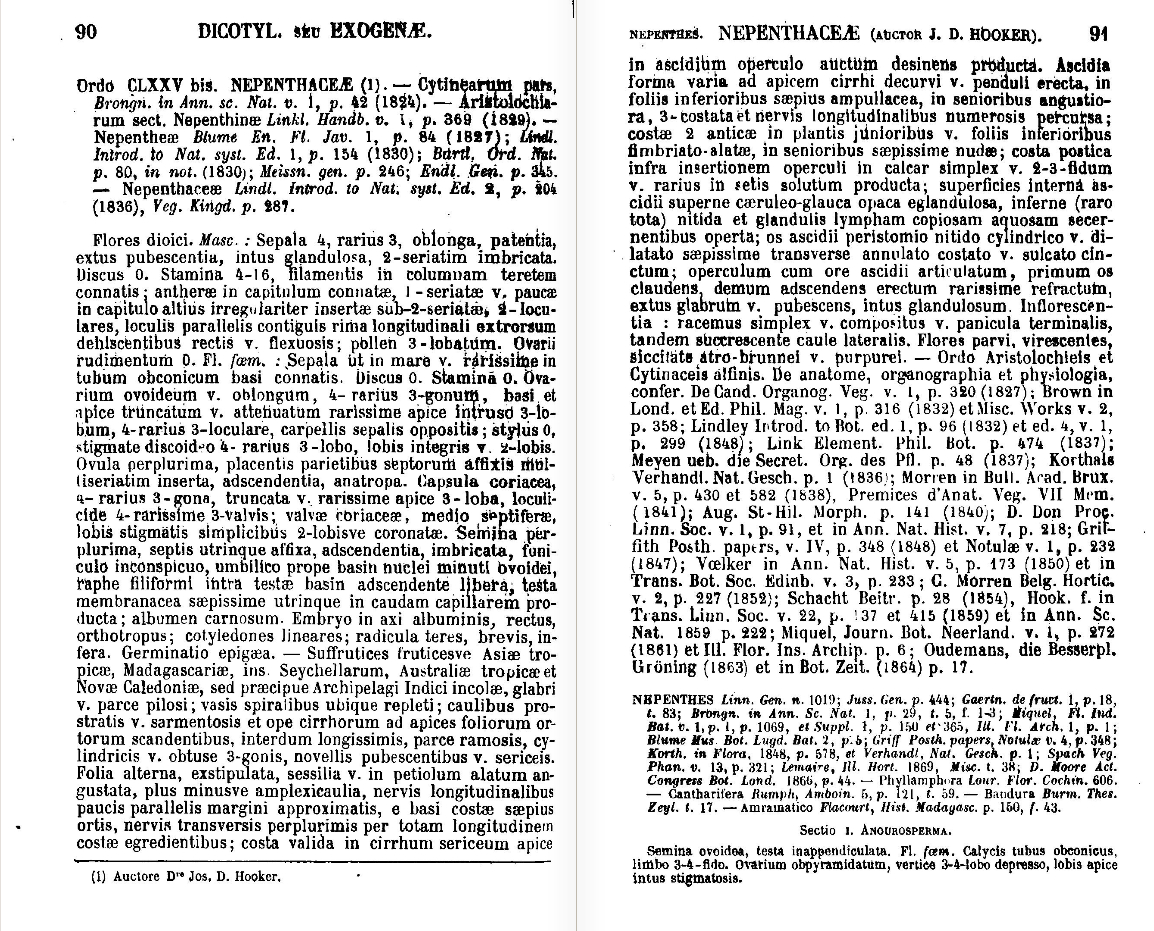
The first two pages of Hooker's monograph

"Nepenthaceae" is a monograph by Joseph Dalton Hooker on the tropical pitcher plants of the genus Nepenthes. It was published in 1873 in the seventeenth and final volume of Augustin Pyramus de Candolle's Prodromus Systematis Naturalis Regni Vegetabilis, which was edited by Augustin's son, Alphonse. The monograph focused primarily on new discoveries from northern Borneo. Unlike most major works on Nepenthes, it included no illustrations.

== Content ==
Published only a year after Ernst Wunschmann's "Über die Gattung Nepenthes", Hooker's monograph expanded the number of known species considerably. Hooker recognised 33 species, including 7 described for the first time: N. bicalcarata, N. celebica (later synonymised with N. maxima), N. echinostoma (later reduced to a variety of N. mirabilis), N. hirsuta, N. khasiana, N. tentaculata, and N. vieillardii. Nepenthes blancoi and N. maxima were listed as "species non satis notæ" (little known species), while N. cristata was included under "species admodum dubia" (very doubtful species). Hooker also described 5 varieties: N. albomarginata var. villosa, N. boschiana var. lowii (later described as N. stenophylla), N. phyllamphora var. macrantha (later synonymised with N. mirabilis), N. rafflesiana var. glaberrima, and N. rafflesiana var. nivea. Most of these varieties are not of taxonomic value today. Hooker's concept of N. rafflesiana encompassed both N. rafflesiana and N. × hookeriana (the natural hybrid between N. ampullaria and N. rafflesiana).

The manuscript of Hooker's monograph formed the basis for an article by Maxwell T. Masters published in the April 20, 1872 issue of The Gardeners' Chronicle and Agricultural Gazette. A number of Hooker's names appeared there for the first time, including the two varieties of N. rafflesiana and one of N. albomarginata; the as yet undescribed N. khasiana was included under the spelling N. khasyana.

=== Species ===
The following taxa are covered in the monograph, with 33 recognised as valid species (including two little known ones).

1. N. alata
2. N. albomarginata
  1. var. villosa
3. N. ampullaria
4. N. bicalcarata
5. N. bongso
6. N. boschiana
  1. var. lowii
  2. var. sumatrana
7. N. celebica
8. N. distillatoria
9. N. echinostoma
10. N. edwardsiana
11. N. eustachya
12. N. gracilis
13. N. hirsuta
14. N. kennedyana
15. N. khasiana
16. N. lowii
17. N. madagascariensis
18. N. melamphora
  1. var. haematamphora
  2. ? var. lucida
19. N. pervillei
20. N. phyllamphora
  1. var. macrantha
21. N. rafflesiana
  1. var. glaberrima
  2. var. nivea
22. N. rajah
23. N. reinwardtiana
24. N. sanguinea
25. N. tentaculata
  1. ? var. "foliis basi longe decurrentibus"
26. N. teysmanniana
27. N. trichocarpa
  1. var. erythrosticta
28. N. veitchii
29. N. ventricosa
30. N. vieillardii
31. N. villosa

Species non satis notæ

1. N. blancoi
2. N. maxima

Species admodum dubia

1. N. cristata

=== Infrageneric classification ===
Hooker attempted the first infrageneric classification of the genus, dividing it into two sections. He placed N. pervillei in the monotypic Anourosperma, distinguishing it on the basis of its round seeds. All other species were subsumed in the second section, Eunepenthes. This classification would be expanded upon in the 1895 monograph of Günther Beck von Mannagetta und Lerchenau, "Die Gattung Nepenthes", and the 1936 work of Hermann Harms, "Nepenthaceae".
