= Die Gattung Nepenthes =

1895 monograph by Günther Beck von Mannagetta und Lerchenau

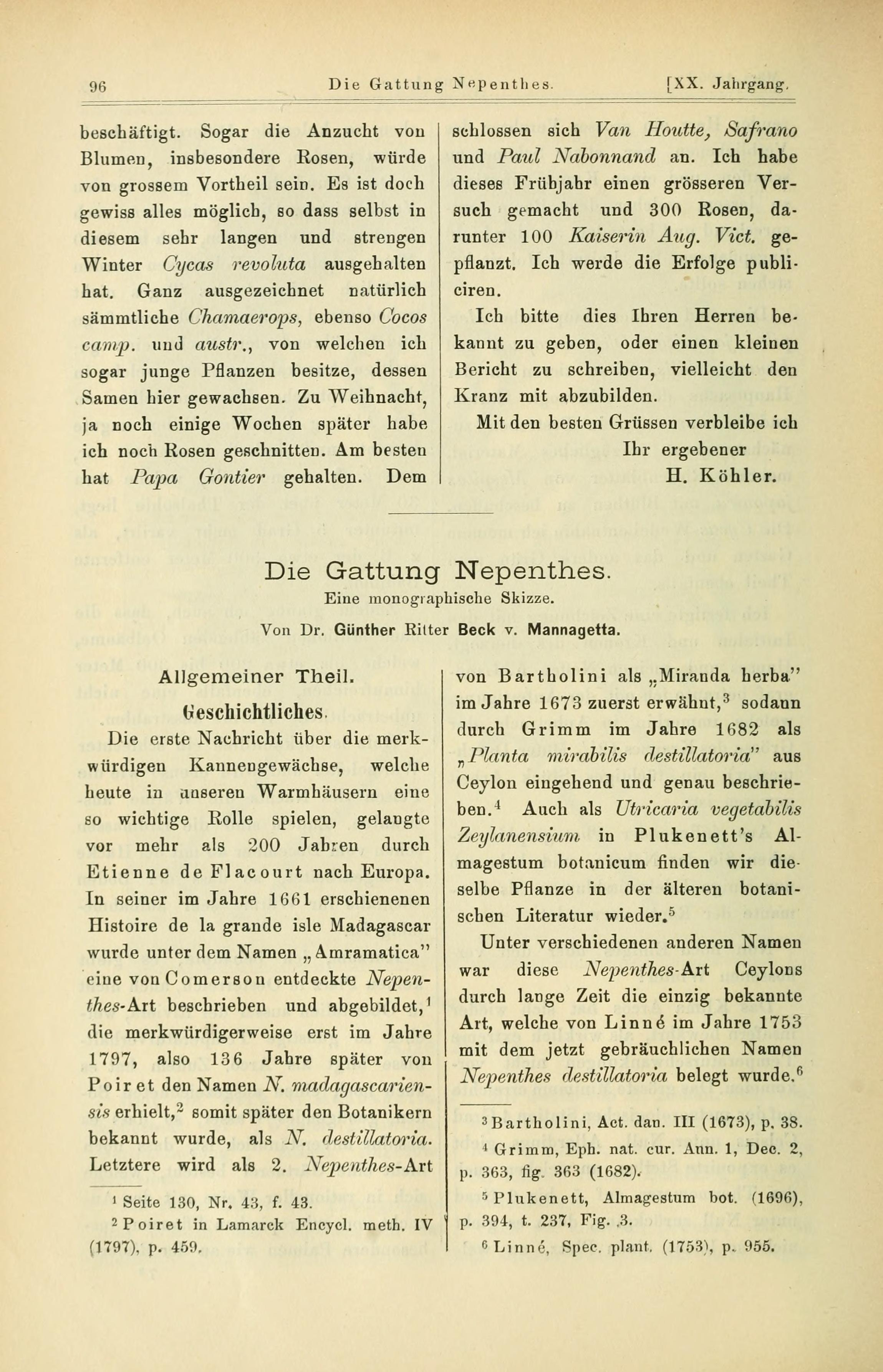
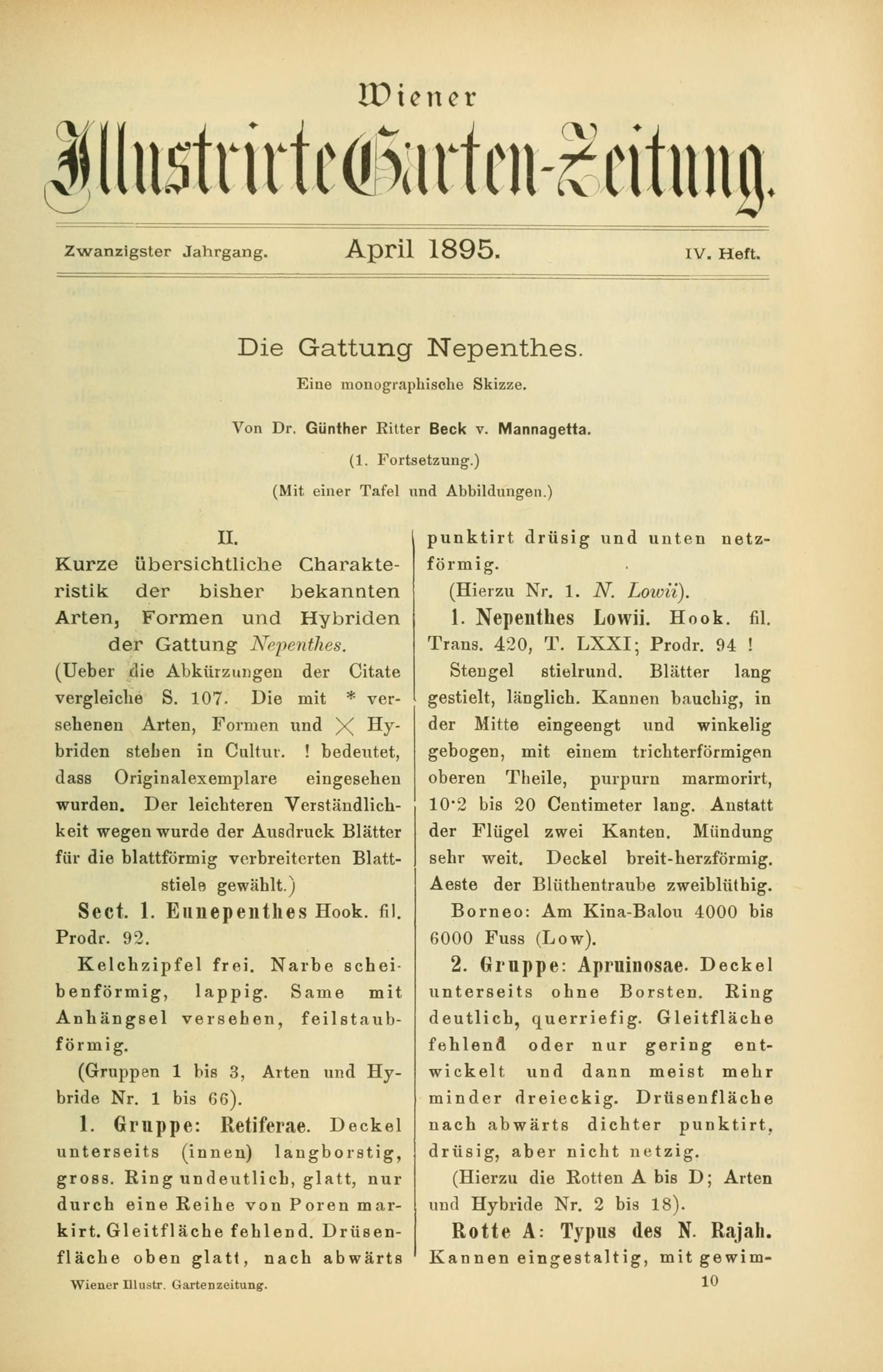
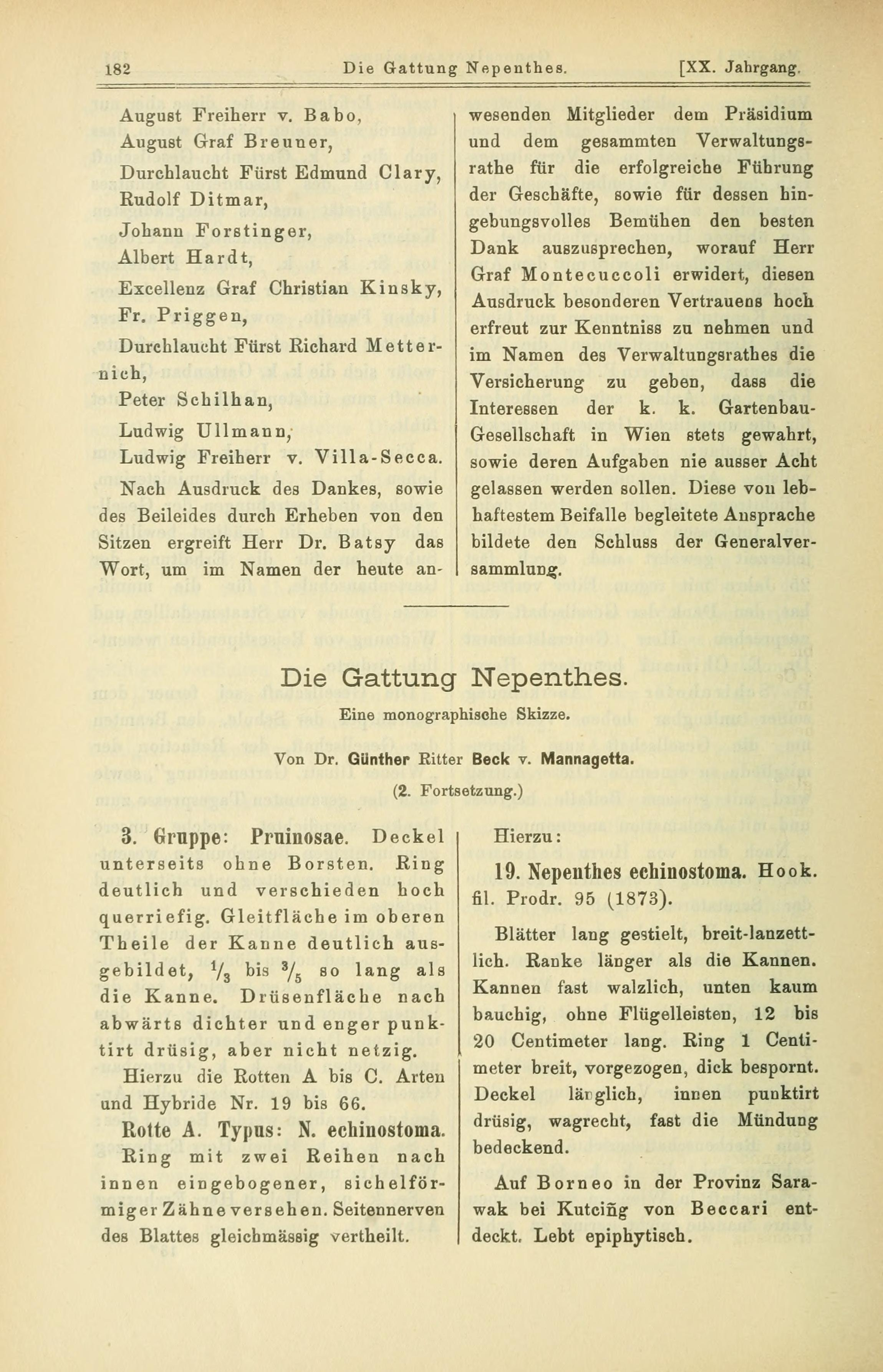
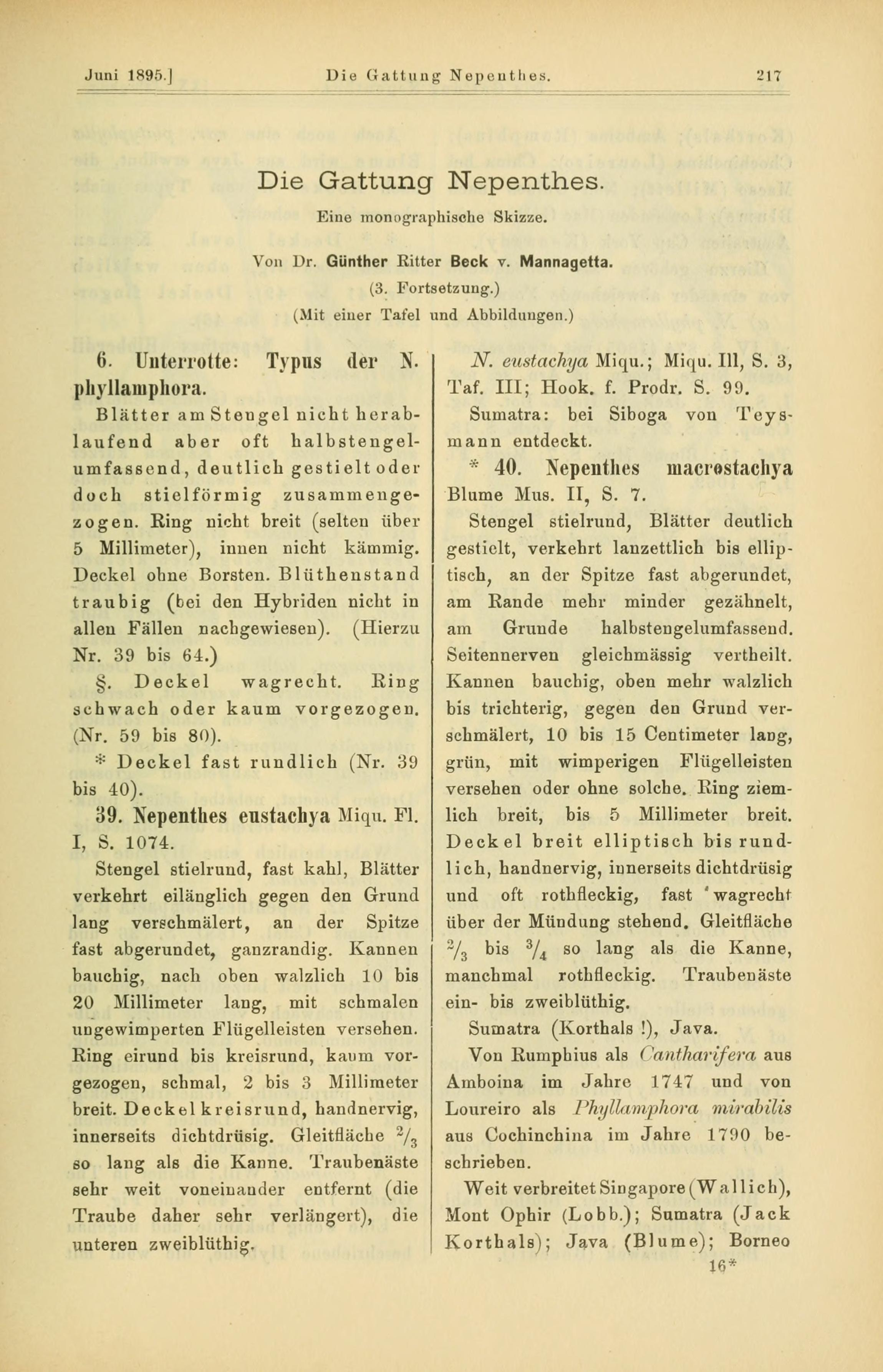
The first pages of each of the four parts of "Die Gattung Nepenthes" from the March, April, May and June issues of Wiener Illustrirte Garten-Zeitung
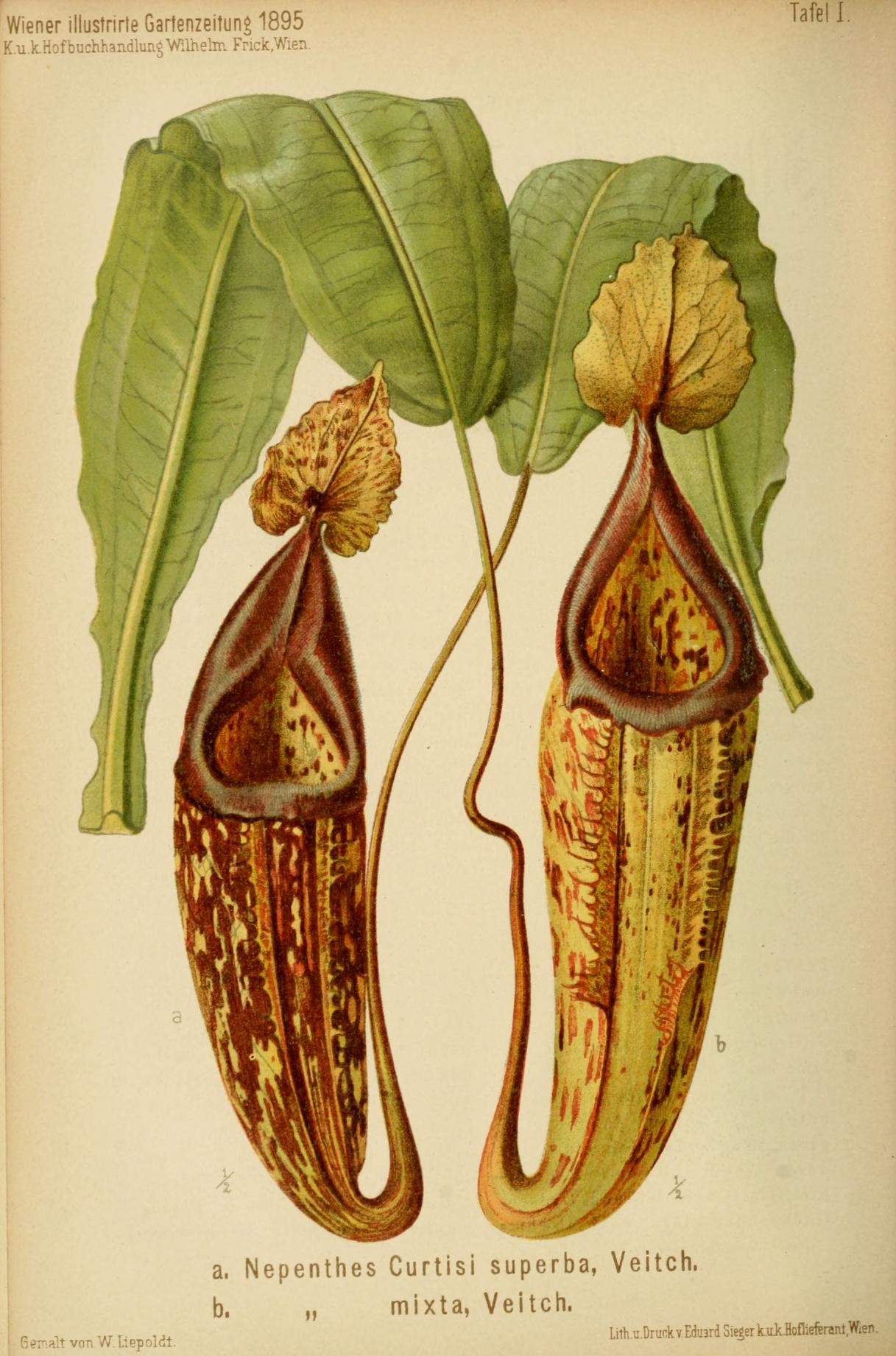
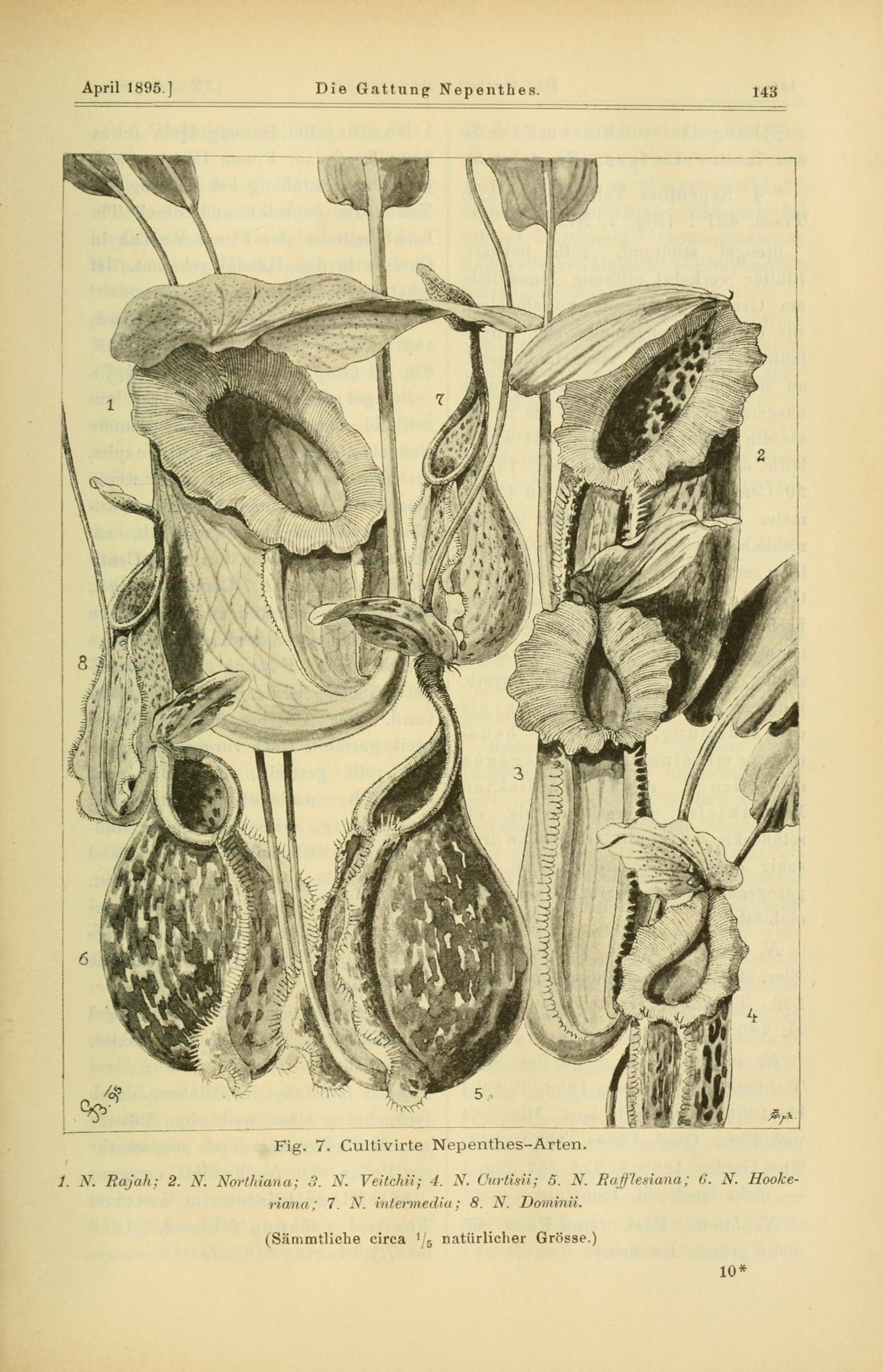
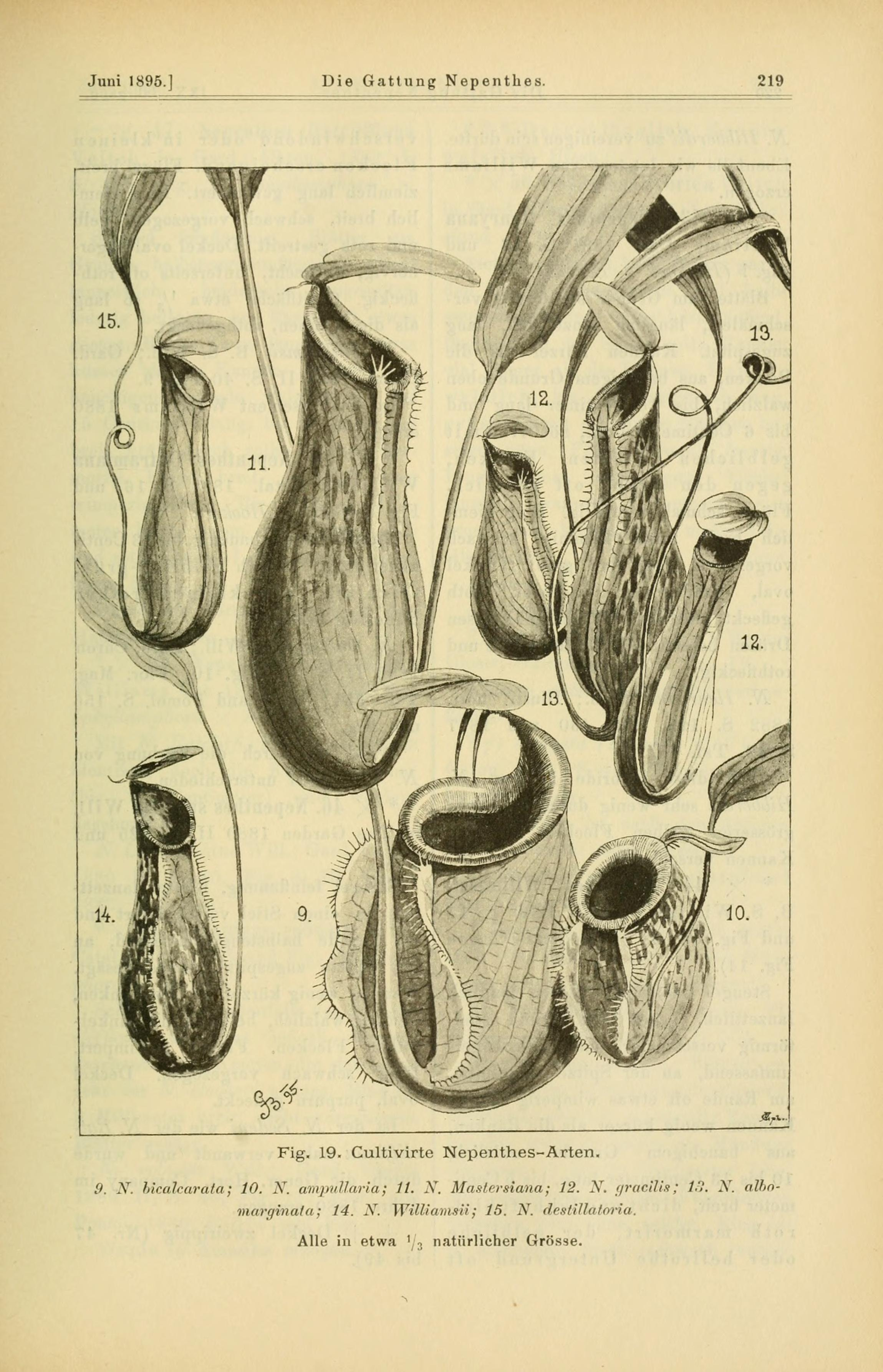
The three illustrations published in Beck's monograph, showing various pitchers drawn from cultivated plants.
Left: N. curtisii var. superba (N. maxima) and N. × mixta
Centre: N. curtisii (N. maxima), N. northiana, N. rafflesiana, N. rajah, N. veitchii, N. × dominii, N. × hookeriana, and N. × intermedia
Right: N. albomarginata, N. ampullaria, N. bicalcarata, N. distillatoria, N. gracilis, N. × mastersiana, and N. × williamsii

"Die Gattung Nepenthes: Eine monographische Skizze" (lit. "The genus Nepenthes: A monographic sketch") is a German-language monograph by Günther Beck von Mannagetta und Lerchenau on the tropical pitcher plants of the genus Nepenthes. It was published in 1895 in four parts, spread over the March, April, May and June issues of Wiener Illustrirte Garten-Zeitung.

== Content ==
Beck recognised and enumerated 67 major taxa, almost half of which were hybrids. Additionally, seven taxa and unnamed horticultural hybrids are listed at the end of the work under "Ungenügend bekannte Arten, Mischarten" (insufficiently known species, mixed species).

Beck described four new species: N. fallax (later synonymised with N. stenophylla, although this is disputed), N. hispida, N. smithii (later synonymised with N. distillatoria), and N. spuria (later synonymised with N. northiana). Beck was also the first to publish N. sumatrana under its present binomial combination, although he introduced it under the entry for N. maxima with the words "Hierzu gehört als Varietät: N. sumatrana" (this includes a variety: N. sumatrana).

Beck also introduced a number of new varieties. These included the species varieties N. albomarginata var. tomentella, N. albomarginata var. typica, N. gracilis var. longinodis, N. gracilis var. teysmanniana, N. rafflesiana var. ambigua, N. rafflesiana var. excelsior (later synonym of N. × hookeriana), and N. rafflesiana var. typica, as well as the hybrid variety N. hybrida var. typica (N. gracilis × N. khasiana).

A number of taxon names that Beck did not recognise as valid nonetheless appeared in print for the first time in his monograph. These included the species synonyms N. edgeworthii (synonym of N. edwardsiana) and N. speciosa (synonym of N. distillatoria), as well as the hybrid synonyms N. anerleyense and N. arnoldiense (both synonyms of N. × stewartii). While the name N. hookerae had first appeared in the literature four years prior to Beck's work, his concept of this hybrid involved a more complex cross (N. mirabilis × (N. rafflesiana × N. ampullaria)); it is considered a later synonym of N. × stewartii.

Beck was the first to unite N. edwardsiana with N. villosa, considering the former a variety or form of the latter. This synonymy stood until John Muirhead Macfarlane's 1908 monograph, "Nepenthaceae", and the species are considered distinct today. Beck thought that N. burkei likely represented a form of N. boschiana ("Hierzu gehört offenbar auch als Form: Nepenthes Burkeii"). He likewise considered N. singalana to be a form of N. sanguinea ("Kaum als Form von N. sanguinea abzutrennen ist: Nepenthes singalana").

=== Species ===
The following 67 taxa are enumerated and detailed in "Die Gattung Nepenthes". Only taxa considered hybrids by Beck are indicated here as such (therefore the natural hybrid N. × trichocarpa is shown as a species). Taxon names are listed as they appear in Beck's monograph, including orthographic variants, though specific epithets derived from proper nouns have been decapitalised.

1. N. alata
2. N. albomarginata
3. N. × amesiana
4. N. ampullaria
5. N. × atrosanguinea
6. N. bicalcarata
7. N. bongso
8. N. boschiana
9. N. celebica
10. N. × chelsoni
11. N. × cincta
12. N. × coccinea
13. N. × compacta
14. N. × courtii
15. N. × cylindrica
16. N. destillatoria [sic]
17. N. × dicksoniana
18. N. × dominii
19. N. × dormanniana
20. N. echinostoma
21. N. × edinensis
22. N. eustachya
23. N. fallax
24. N. gracilis
25. N. × henryana
26. N. × hibberdii
27. N. hirsuta
28. N. hispida
29. N. × hookerae
30. N. × hybrida
31. N. × intermedia
32. N. khasiana
33. N. × lawrenciana
34. N. lowii
35. N. macrostachya
36. N. madagascariensis
37. N. × mastersiana
38. N. maxima
39. N. melamphora
40. N. × mixta
41. N. × morganiae
42. N. northiana
43. N. × outramiana
44. N. × paradisae
45. N. pervillei
46. N. rafflesiana
47. N. rajah
48. N. × ratcliffiana
49. N. reinwardtiana
50. N. × robusta
51. N. × rubro maculata
52. N. × rufescens
53. N. sanguinea
54. N. × sedeni
55. N. smithii
56. ? N. spuria
57. N. stenophylla
58. N. × stewartii
59. N. × superba
60. N. tentaculata
61. N. trichocarpa
62. N. veitchii
63. N. ventricosa
64. N. vieillardii
65. N. villosa
66. N. × williamsii
67. N. × wrigleyana

Ungenügend bekannte Arten, Mischarten

1. N. bernaysii
2. N. burbidgeae
3. N. cristata
4. N. × lyrata
5. N. loddigesi
6. N. veitchii × N. rafflesiana
7. N. sanguinea × N. destillatoria

=== Infrageneric classification ===
The infrageneric classification in "Die Gattung Nepenthes" follows that introduced by Joseph Dalton Hooker in his 1873 monograph, "Nepenthaceae". Hooker placed N. pervillei in the monotypic Anourosperma, distinguishing it on the basis of its round seeds, and subsumed all remaining species in the second section, Eunepenthes. Beck kept the two sections created by Hooker (spelling Anourosperma as Anowrosperma), but divided Eunepenthes into three subgroups: Apruinosae, Pruinosae, and Retiferae, the last containing only N. lowii.
