= Anelosimus decaryi =

Scientific classification
- Kingdom: Animalia
- Phylum: Arthropoda
- Subphylum: Chelicerata
- Class: Arachnida
- Order: Araneae
- Infraorder: Araneomorphae
- Family: Theridiidae
- Genus: Anelosimus
- Species: A. decaryi

Binomial name
- Anelosimus decaryi (Fage, 1930)

Synonyms
- Theridion decaryi Fage, 1930; Anelosimus locketi Roberts, 1983

Species of spider

Anelosimus decaryi is a species of spider in the family Theridiidae. It is found in Madagascar, the Seychelles (Aldabra), Comoros, and Mayotte. The species is notable for its association with pitcher plants of the genus Nepenthes, where it constructs webs to capture small insects.

== Etymology ==
The species name decaryi honors the French botanist Raymond Decary, who collected the original specimens in Madagascar.

== Taxonomy ==
The species was originally described as Theridion decaryi by Louis Fage in 1930, based on specimens found in the pitchers of Nepenthes madagascariensis in Madagascar. In 1983, M.J. Roberts described what he believed to be a new species, Anelosimus locketi, from Aldabra in the Seychelles. However, in 2005, Agnarsson and Kuntner recognized that Roberts' species was actually the same as Fage's Theridion decaryi, transferring it to the genus Anelosimus and synonymizing A. locketi with A. decaryi.

== Distribution ==
Anelosimus decaryi has been recorded from several locations across the western Indian Ocean region. In Madagascar, it has been found around Fort-Dauphin (now Tôlanaro), Sainte-Marie Island, and Diego-Suarez (now Antsiranana). The species also occurs in the Seychelles, specifically on Aldabra Atoll, as well as in the Comoros and Mayotte.

== Habitat ==
This spider has a remarkable ecological association with carnivorous pitcher plants of the genus Nepenthes. Unlike some other spider species that live inside the pitchers themselves, A. decaryi constructs its webs on the exterior of the plants, particularly utilizing the upper rim and external surfaces of the pitchers as anchor points for its web. The spider positions itself to take advantage of small flying insects, particularly Diptera, that are attracted to the pitcher plants.

== Description ==
Female A. decaryi measure 3.5-4.0 mm in body length, while males are slightly smaller at 3.0-3.5 mm.

=== Females ===
Females have a pale cephalothorax with a thin marginal black line and a broad median black band that narrows toward the middle. The median eyes form a trapezoid that is as long as it is wide. The chelicerae are much longer than the width of the cephalothorax, with a pale base that darkens toward the edges.

The legs are pale with darkened segment tips, and often display a median brown spot on the inner surface of the tibiae. The opisthosoma is oval-shaped and pale with a dull white coloration, darker sides and underside, and a median dorsal brown band with scalloped edges.

The epigyne appears as a transverse slit marked with horizontal folds and bordered posteriorly by a chitinized rim that produces a short, upturned hook.

=== Males ===
Males have notably elongated first legs compared to the other pairs, with thickened femora that taper gradually toward the base and slightly thickened tibiae toward the tip.

== See also ==
- Nepenthes infauna
- Thomisus nepenthiphilus (Fage, 1930) - another pitcher plant spider
