= Thomisus nepenthiphilus =

Scientific classification
- Kingdom: Animalia
- Phylum: Arthropoda
- Subphylum: Chelicerata
- Class: Arachnida
- Order: Araneae
- Infraorder: Araneomorphae
- Family: Thomisidae
- Genus: Thomisus
- Species: T. nepenthiphilus

Binomial name
- Thomisus nepenthiphilus Fage, 1930

Species of spider

Thomisus nepenthiphilus is a species of crab spider in the family Thomisidae. It is endemic to Indonesia, specifically the island of Sumatra.

== Etymology ==
The species name nepenthiphilus is derived from the genus name Nepenthes (pitcher plants) and the Greek suffix -philus meaning "loving", referring to the spider's habitat in the pitchers of Nepenthes plants.

== Distribution ==
Thomisus nepenthiphilus has been recorded exclusively from Sumatra, Indonesia and Singapore. The original specimens were collected from multiple locations including Sosorladang, Rahoetbosidolok, and Maranti.

== Habitat ==
This species has a highly specialized habitat, living within the pitcher traps of Nepenthes plants, specifically Nepenthes tobaica and Nepenthes reinwardtiana. The spiders are found inside the urns (pitchers) of these carnivorous plants.

== Description ==
=== Female ===
The female has a body length of 10 mm with a pale yellowish-white cephalothorax and anterior legs. The ocular area is dull white with sharp ocular tubercles extending well beyond the lateral eyes, with reddish extremities. The posterior legs and opisthosoma are dull yellowish-white, with the abdomen being pentagonal with protruding lateral angles. The body appears smooth and very slightly oblique.

The median eyes are equal to the lateral eyes, but the anterior eyes are separated by an interval equal to 1.5 times that which separates them from the lateral eyes. There are some short spines on the anterior face of femur I and femur II, as well as a dorsal spine.

=== Male ===
The male is drastically smaller, with a body length of 3.5 mm. It has a pale reddish coloration, except for the two pairs of posterior legs which are lighter. The tegument is furnished with granulations topped with short hairs. The abdomen has the same form as in the female, but is covered with a dorsal scutum covering it almost entirely and bordered by short and robust spicules. The epigastric region is hardened. There is a strong tooth-like projection on the external face of the chelicerae.

== Taxonomy ==
Thomisus nepenthiphilus is closely related to Thomisus callidus from Nias Island on the west coast of Sumatra. It can be distinguished by its notably larger size (the male of T. callidus measures only 2 mm), by the armature of the anterior tibiae and metatarsi which are unarmed in T. callidus, by its smooth body lacking the characteristic granular trapeze of T. callidus, and by its equal eyes. Additionally, in T. nepenthiphilus, the anterior legs, especially the femurs, are much more slender, the seminal receptacles do not form a V-shape here, and in the male, the point of the pedipalp tarsus is clearly longer with the style insertion visibly more anterior.

== See also ==
- Nepenthes infauna
- Anelosimus decaryi Fage, 1930 - another pitcher plant spider
