= Nepenthes minima =

Scientific classification
- Kingdom: Plantae
- Clade: Embryophytes
- Clade: Tracheophytes
- Clade: Angiosperms
- Clade: Eudicots
- Order: Caryophyllales
- Family: Nepenthaceae
- Genus: Nepenthes
- Species: N. minima

Binomial name
- Nepenthes minima Jebb & Cheek (2016)

Synonyms
- Nepenthes maxima 'Lake Poso' D.P.Evans (2009)

Tropical pitcher plant endemic to Sulawesi

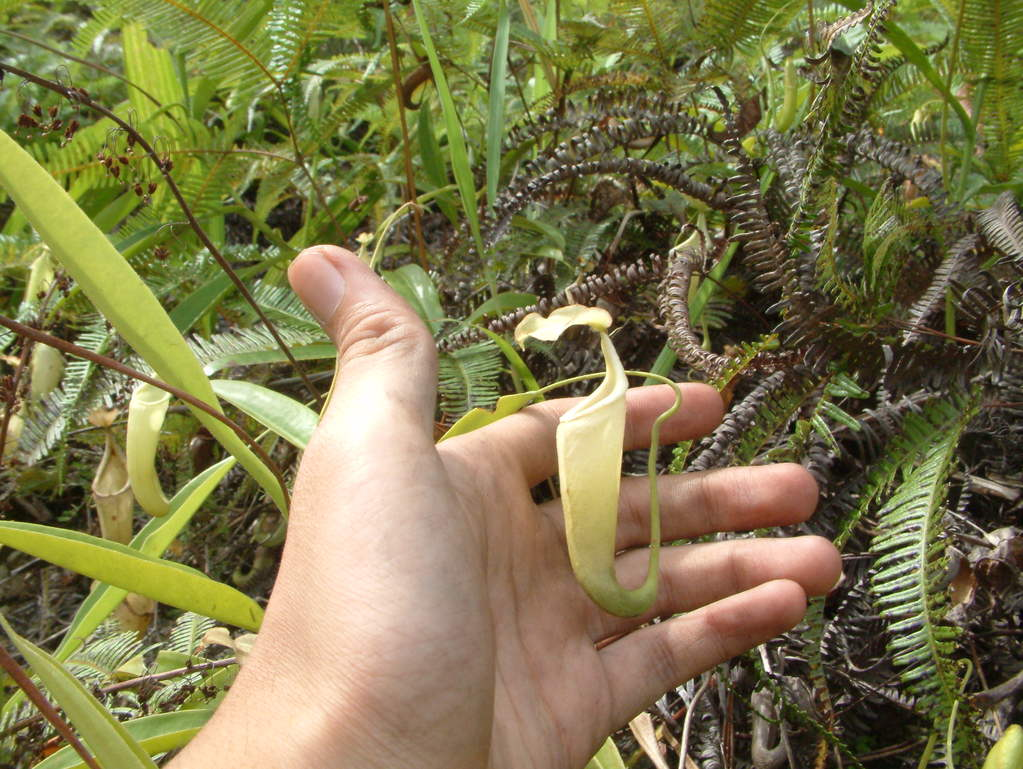

Nepenthes minima is a tropical pitcher plant native to Central Sulawesi, Indonesia. It grows in seasonally dry grasslands at elevations of 1,000–1,700 m above sea level, and has a number of adaptations to survive wildfires. It is the only pyrophytic Nepenthes species known from outside Indochina and the Philippines.

The specific epithet minima, Latin for "smallest", was chosen as an antonym to that of the closely allied N. maxima, with which this species was long conflated and from which it differs in being smaller in all respects. In 2009 this species was described as a cultivar from the area around Lake Poso in Central Sulawesi: Nepenthes maxima 'Lake Poso'.
