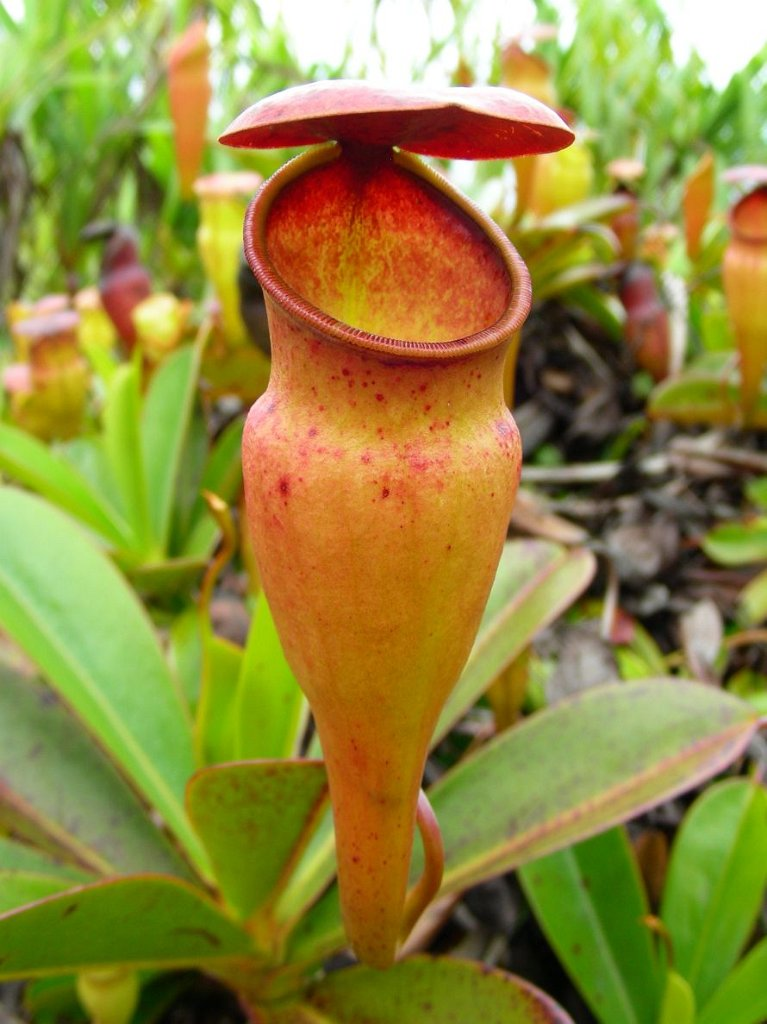
- An upper pitcher of Nepenthes pervillei

Conservation status
- Least Concern (IUCN 3.1)

Scientific classification
- Kingdom: Plantae
- Clade: Tracheophytes
- Clade: Angiosperms
- Clade: Eudicots
- Order: Caryophyllales
- Family: Nepenthaceae
- Genus: Nepenthes
- Species: N. pervillei

Binomial name
- Nepenthes pervillei Blume (1852)

Synonyms
- Anurosperma pervillei (Blume) Hallier f. (1921); Nepenthes wardii E.P.Wright (1869)

= Nepenthes pervillei =

Species of pitcher plant from the Seychelles

Nepenthes pervillei (/nɪˈpɛnθiːz pɜːrˈvɪliaɪ/; after Auguste Pervillé, French plant collector) is the only pitcher plant found in the Seychelles, where it is endemic to the islands of Mahé and Silhouette. It grows in rocky areas near granitic mountain summits, its roots reaching deep into rock fissures. The species has an altitudinal range of 350–750 m above sea level. Like all members of the genus, N. pervillei is dioecious, having separate male and female plants.

The mite Creutzeria seychellensis has been found in the pitchers of N. pervillei.

== Taxonomy ==
The species was originally described as Nepenthes pervillei in 1852, but was later placed in the monotypic genus Anurosperma as Anurosperma pervillei, based on the morphology of its seeds, which differ from the closely allied N. madagascariensis (and the other members of Nepenthes) in that they lack the 'tails' characteristic of the rest of the genus. However, the more recent taxonomic database of Jan Schlauer subsumes Anurosperma back into Nepenthes.

Long considered one of the more "primitive" species of Nepenthes, recent molecular phylogenies have consistently placed N. pervillei in a basal position within the genus.

== Gallery ==
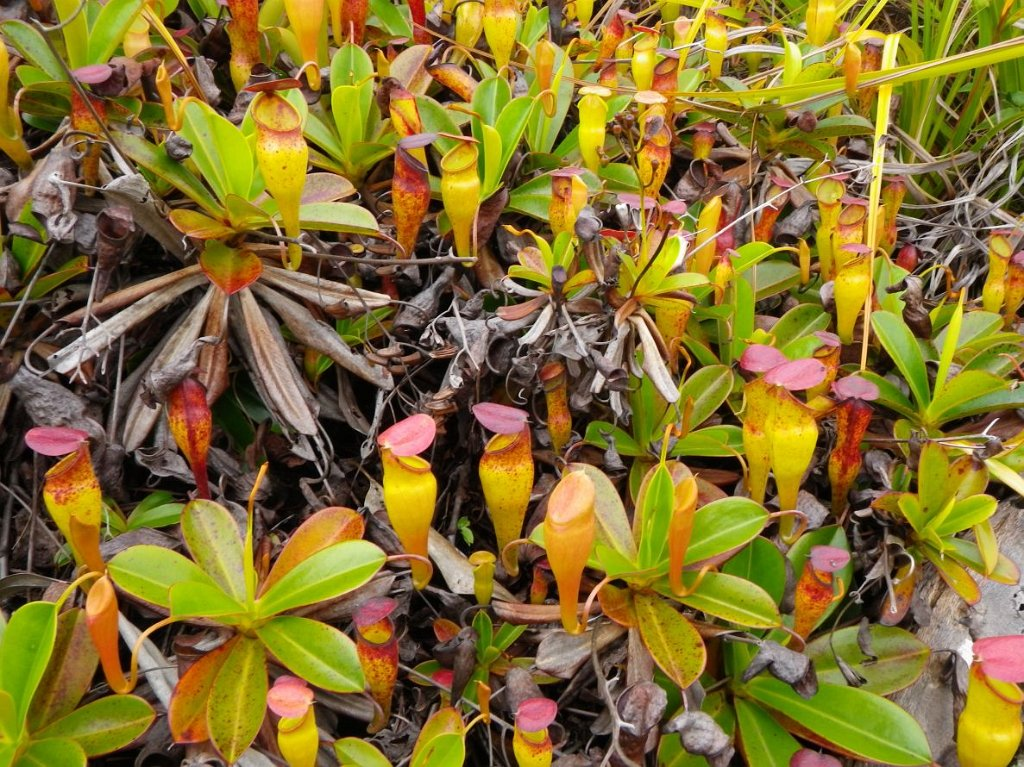
Offshoots bearing mature pitchers

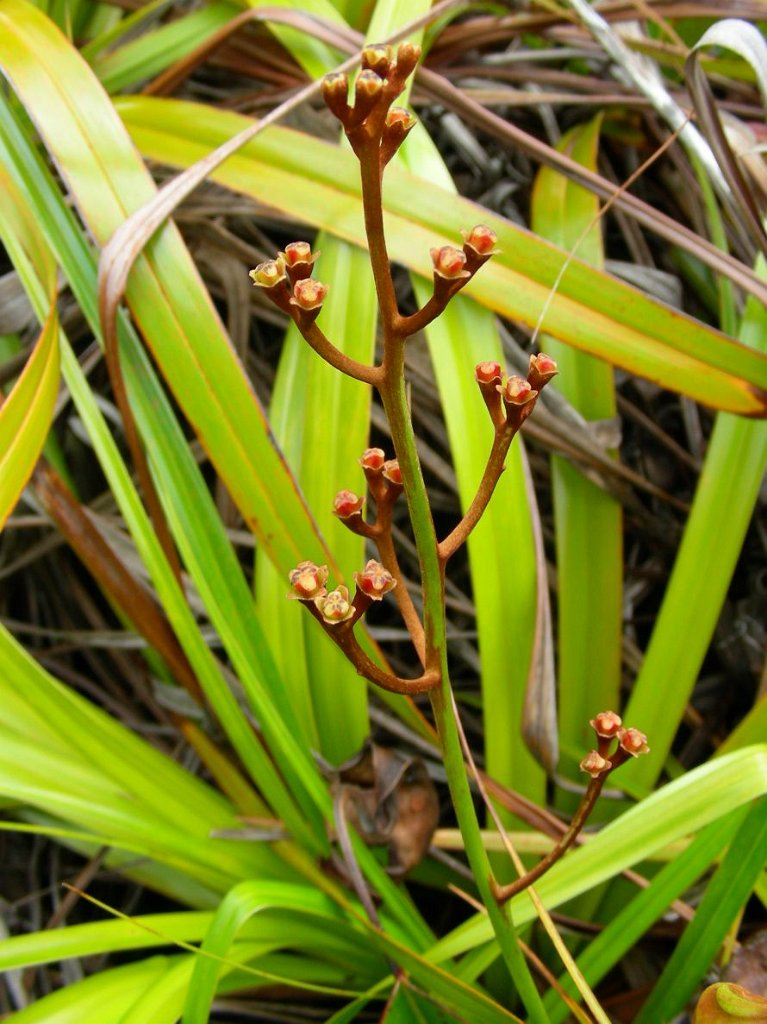
Inflorescence
