= Günther Beck von Mannagetta und Lerchenau =

Austrian botanist (1856–1931)

Günther Ritter Beck von Mannagetta und Lerchenau^{[a]} (25 August 1856 in Pressburg, modern Bratislava – 23 June 1931 in Prague) was an Austrian botanist.

== Life ==
Ritter Beck-Mannagetta, son of a state prosecutor, studied at the University of Vienna, where he graduated as Dr. phil. in 1878.

After a period working as a volunteer at the Botanisches Hofkabinett, (later the Natural History Museum), he became head of the Botanical Department there from 1885 to 1899. Together with Alexander Zahlbruckner as co-editor he published the exsiccata series Kryptogamae exsiccatae editae a Museo Palatino Vindobonensi from 1896 until 1898. In 1894 he became assistant professor, and in 1895 associate professor at the University of Vienna.

From 1899 to 1921 he was professor of systematic botany at the German Charles University in Prague and head of the Botanical Garden there.

His main interests were plant geography and the flora of the Alps and the Balkans. Beck also revised the pitcher plant genus Nepenthes in his 1895 monograph, "Die Gattung Nepenthes".

In 1933, botanist Harry Sm. published a genus of flowering plants from Siberia and China, belonging to the family Orobanchaceae, as Mannagettaea in his honour.

== Some publications ==
- Flora von Niederösterreich (1890–1893)
- Die Vegetationsverhältnisse der illyrischen Länder begreifend Südkroatien, die Quarnero-Inseln, Dalmatien, Bosnien und die Hercegovina, Montenegro, Nordalbanien, den Sandzak Novipazar und Serbien (1901)
- Hilfsbuch für Pflanzensammler (1902)
- Flora Bosne, Hercegovine i Novipazarskog Sandzaka (three volumes, 1903–1927)
- Grundriß der Naturgeschichte des Pflanzenreiches, (1908)
- He also contributed to Engler and Prantl's Die natürlichen Pflanzenfamilien: Orobanchaceae.

== Notes ==
a. Ritter is a title, best translated as knight, in the British sense of an hereditary knighthood, not a first or middle name.
