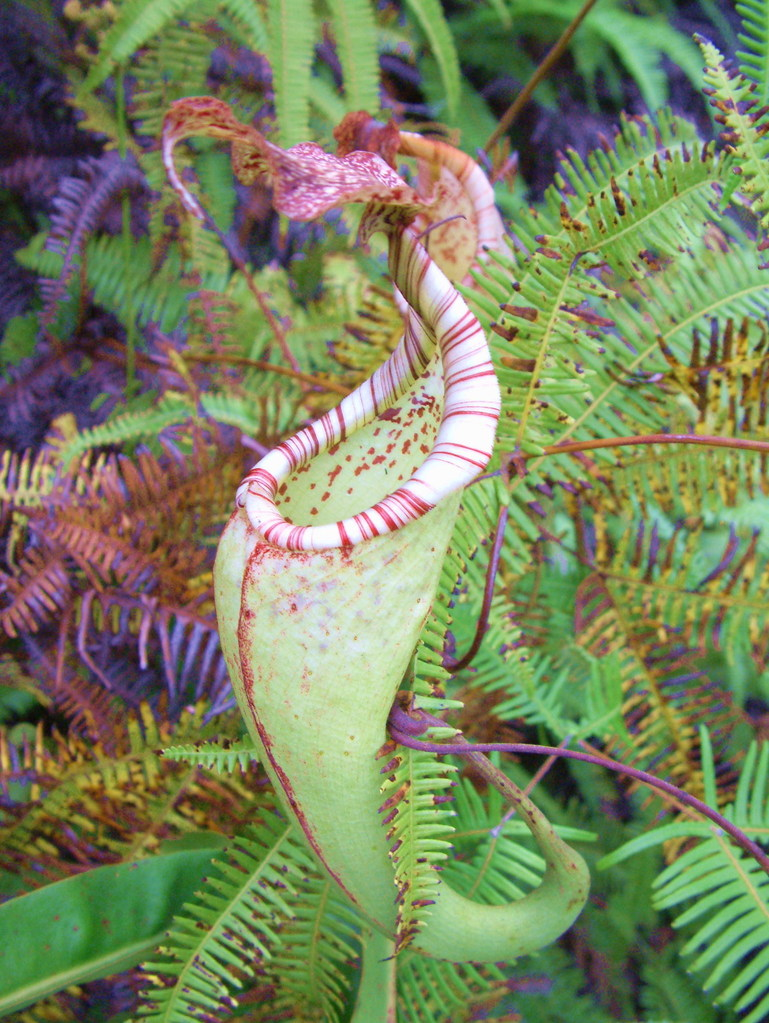
- An upper pitcher of Nepenthes maxima from Sulawesi (~400 m asl)

Conservation status
- Least Concern (IUCN 3.1)

Scientific classification
- Kingdom: Plantae
- Clade: Embryophytes
- Clade: Tracheophytes
- Clade: Angiosperms
- Clade: Eudicots
- Order: Caryophyllales
- Family: Nepenthaceae
- Genus: Nepenthes
- Species: N. maxima

Binomial name
- Nepenthes maxima Reinw. ex Nees (1824)

Synonyms
- Synonyms: Nepenthes boschiana auct. non Korth.: Becc. (1878); Nepenthes celebica Hook.f. (1873); Nepenthes curtisii Mast. (1887); Nepenthes curtisii var. superba Hort.Veitch ex Marshall (1889); Nepenthes dayana A.Truffaut ex M.J.Sallier (1894) nom.superfl.; N. maxima × N. albomarginata Hort.Bednar (1987); Nepenthes oblanceolata Ridl. (1916); Nepenthes spectabilis auct. non Danser: Hort. ex Hort.Bednar (1987); Heterochresonyms: Nepenthes maxima auct. non Reinw. ex Nees: Becc. (1886) [=N. boschiana/N. maxima/N. stenophylla/N. sumatrana]; Nepenthes maxima auct. non Reinw. ex Nees: Cheers (1992) [=N. northiana × N. maxima]; Pre-Linnaean names: "Cantharifera alba" Rumph. (1750)

= Nepenthes maxima =

Tropical pitcher plant from New Guinea and surrounding islands

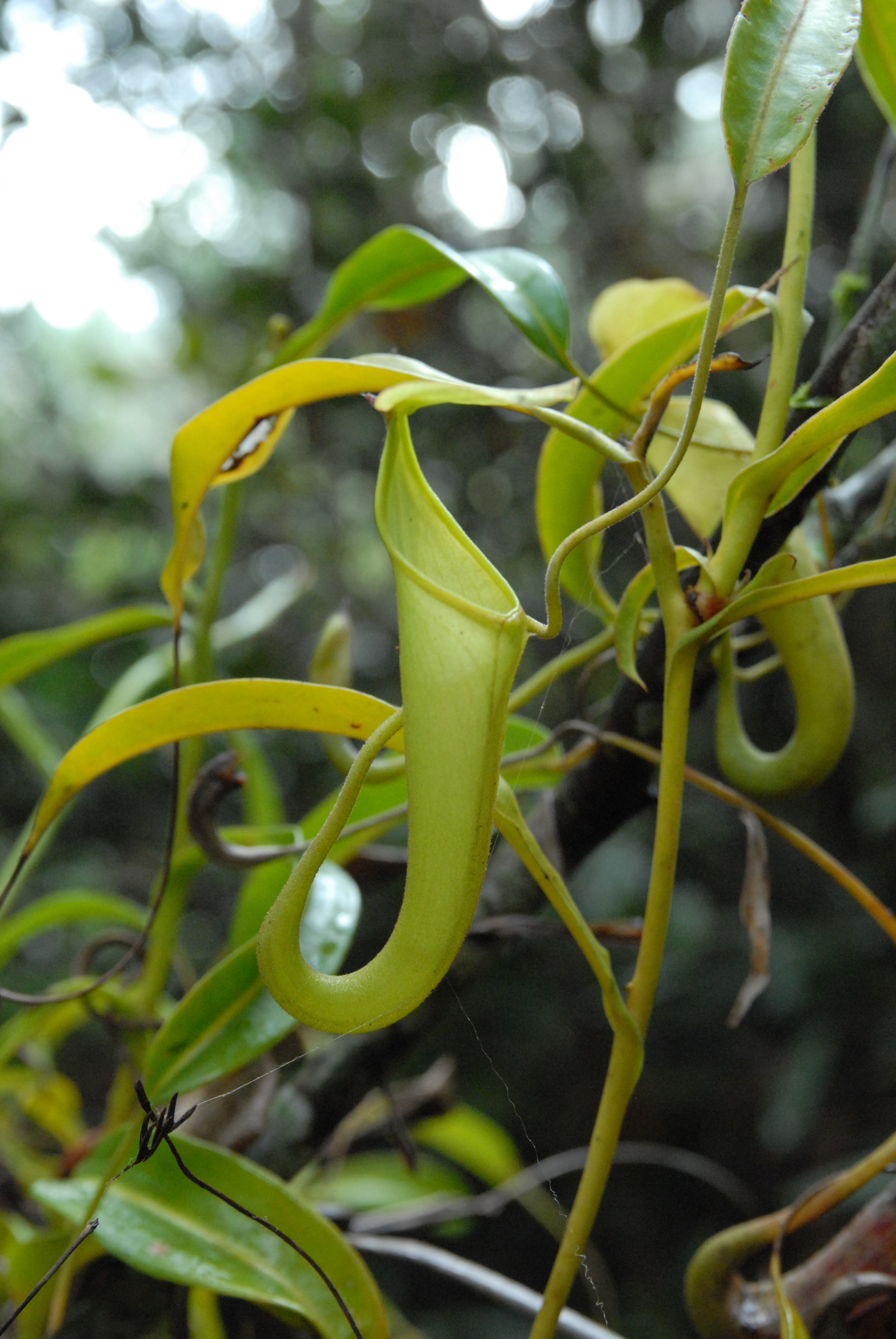
An upper pitcher of a plant matching the description of N. oblanceolata, which is sometimes regarded as a synonym of N. maxima

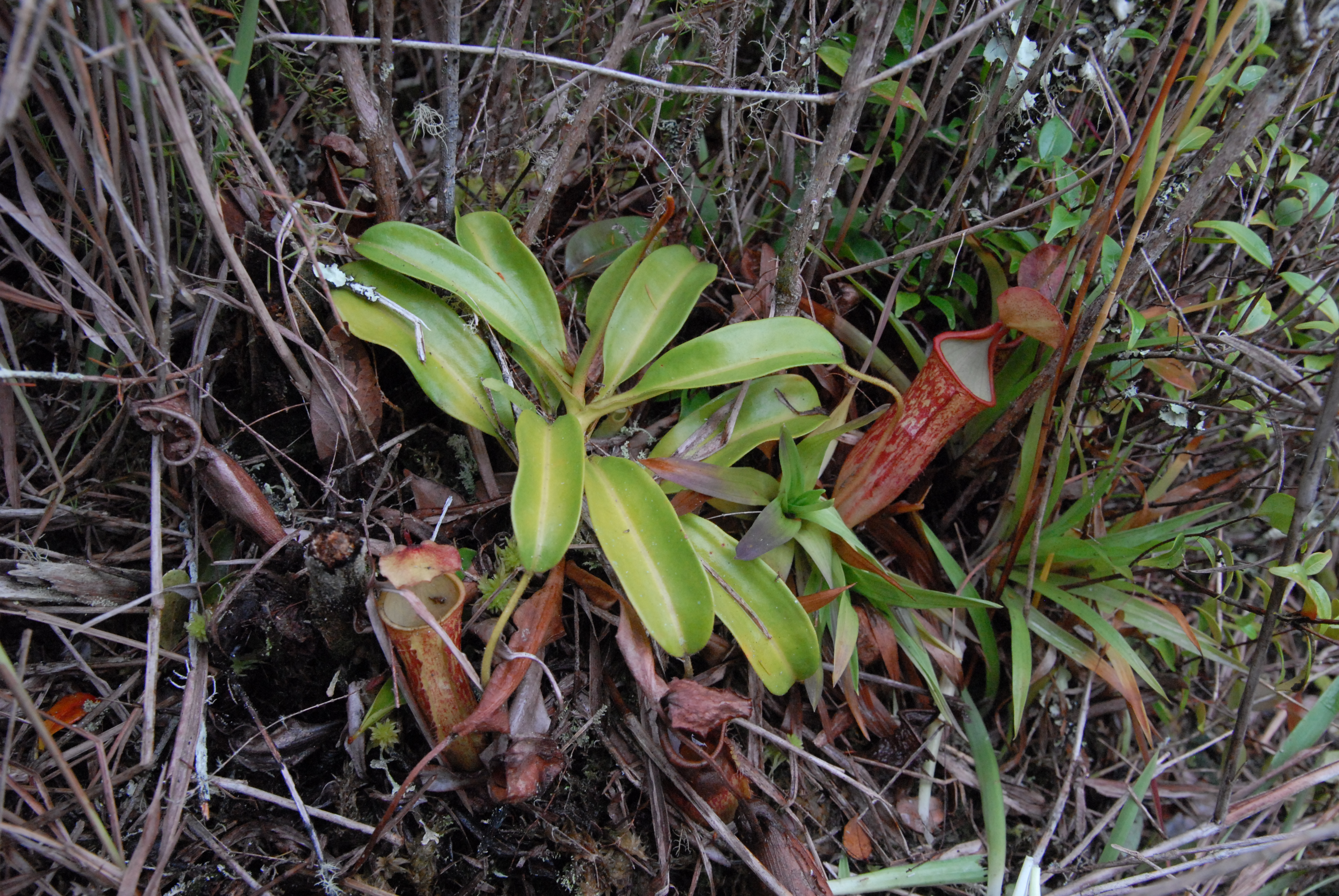
A rosette plant of N. oblanceolata from near Wamena, Baliem Valley, New Guinea

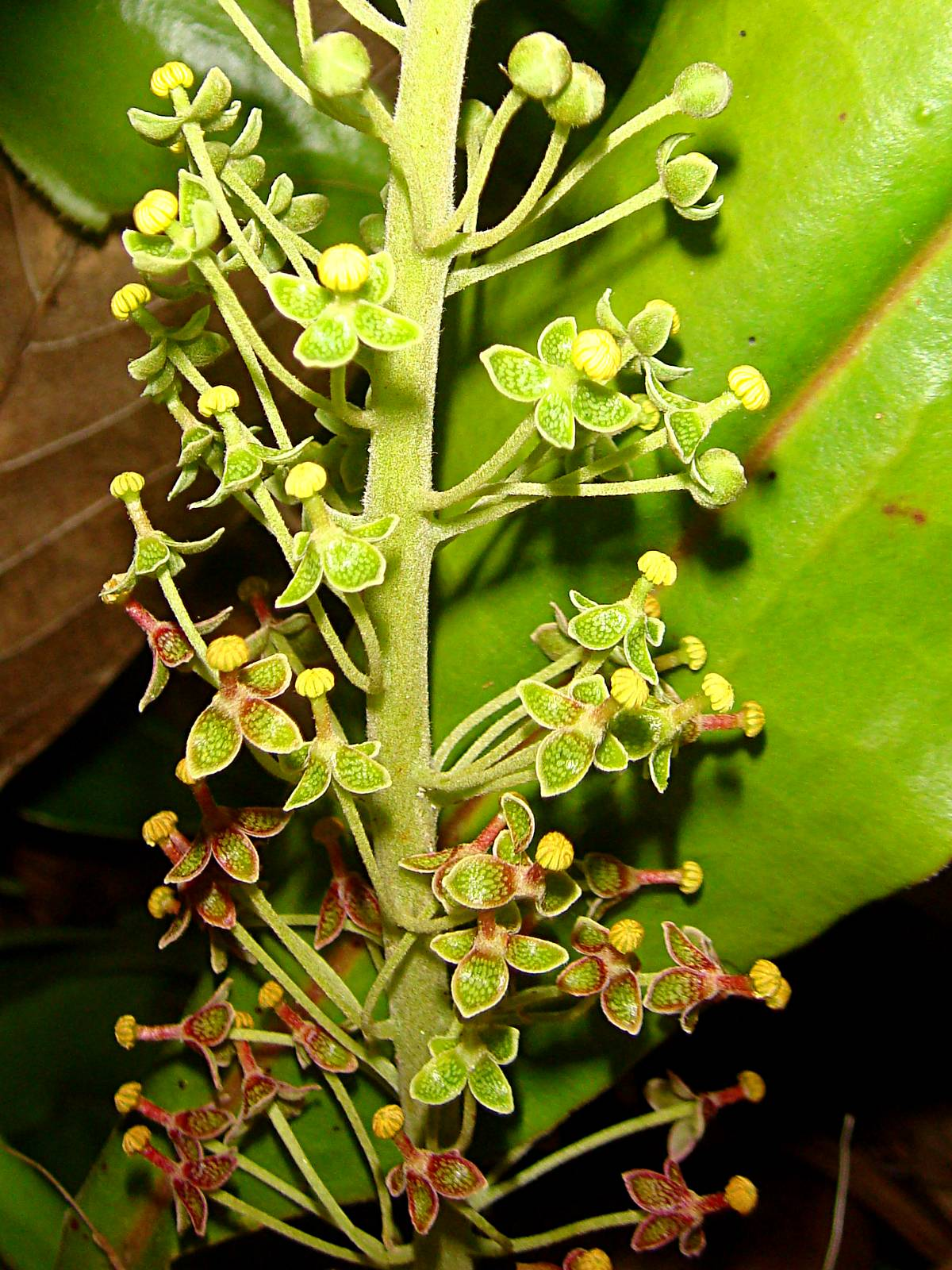
Male inflorescence

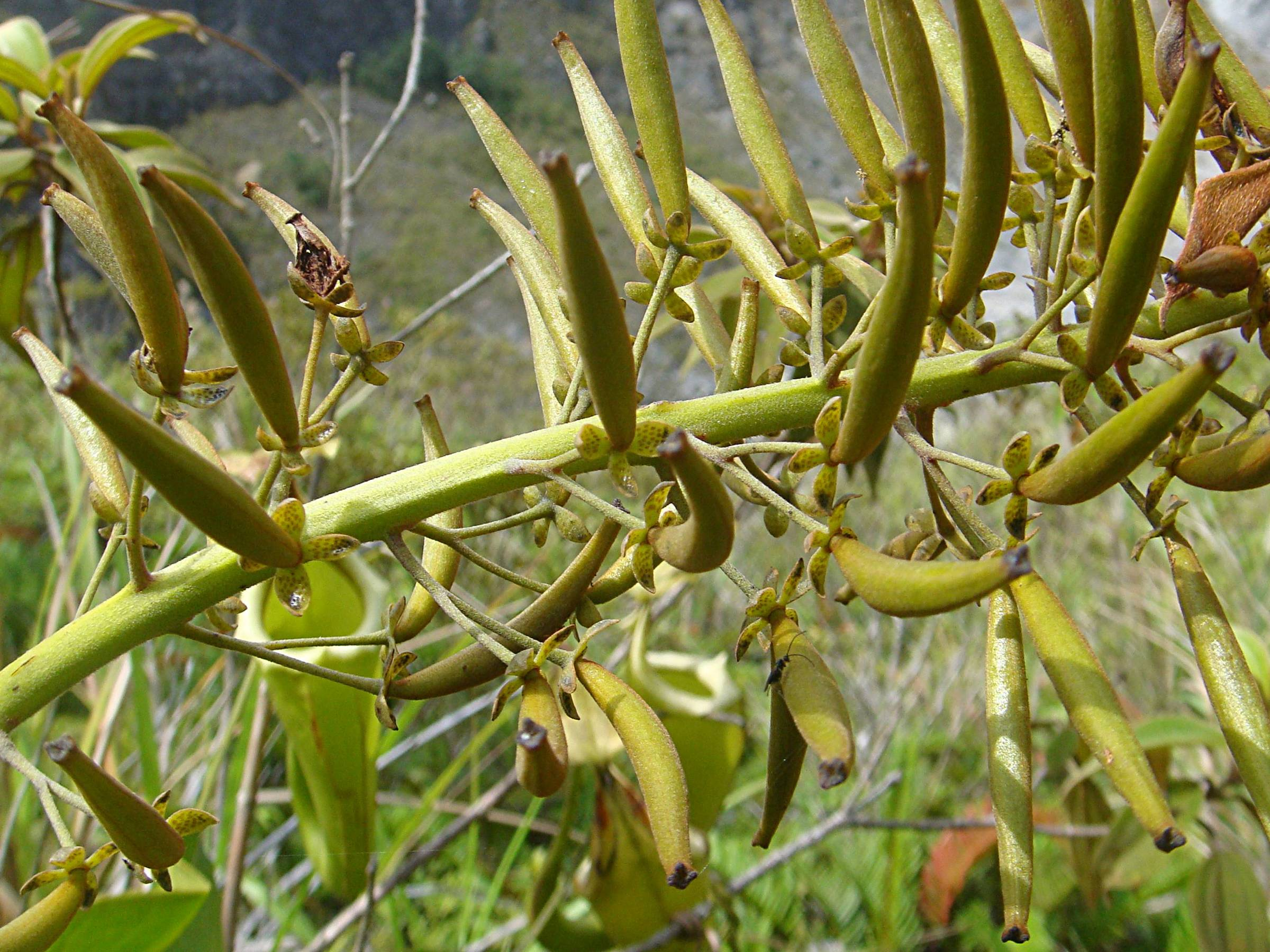
Infructescence

Nepenthes maxima (/nɪˈpɛnθiːz ˈmæksɪmə/; from Latin: maximus "greatest"), the great pitcher-plant, is a carnivorous pitcher plant species of the genus Nepenthes. It has a relatively wide distribution covering New Guinea, Sulawesi, and the Maluku Islands. It may also be present on Wowoni Island.

Nepenthes maxima belongs to the loosely defined "N. maxima complex", which also includes, among other species, N. boschiana, N. chaniana, N. epiphytica, N. eymae, N. faizaliana, N. fusca, N. klossii, N. platychila, N. stenophylla, and N. vogelii.

== Variability ==
This species exhibits great variability across its range, particularly in the plasticity of its pitchers. Plants growing in drier, somewhat seasonal parts of New Guinea generally produce elongated pitchers with narrow peristomes and well-developed waxy zones, while those inhabiting perhumid areas often have a reduced waxy zone and enlarged peristome. This is thought to be because the peristome, when fully wetted, is more effective at trapping prey than the waxy zone, but performs poorly in drier conditions.

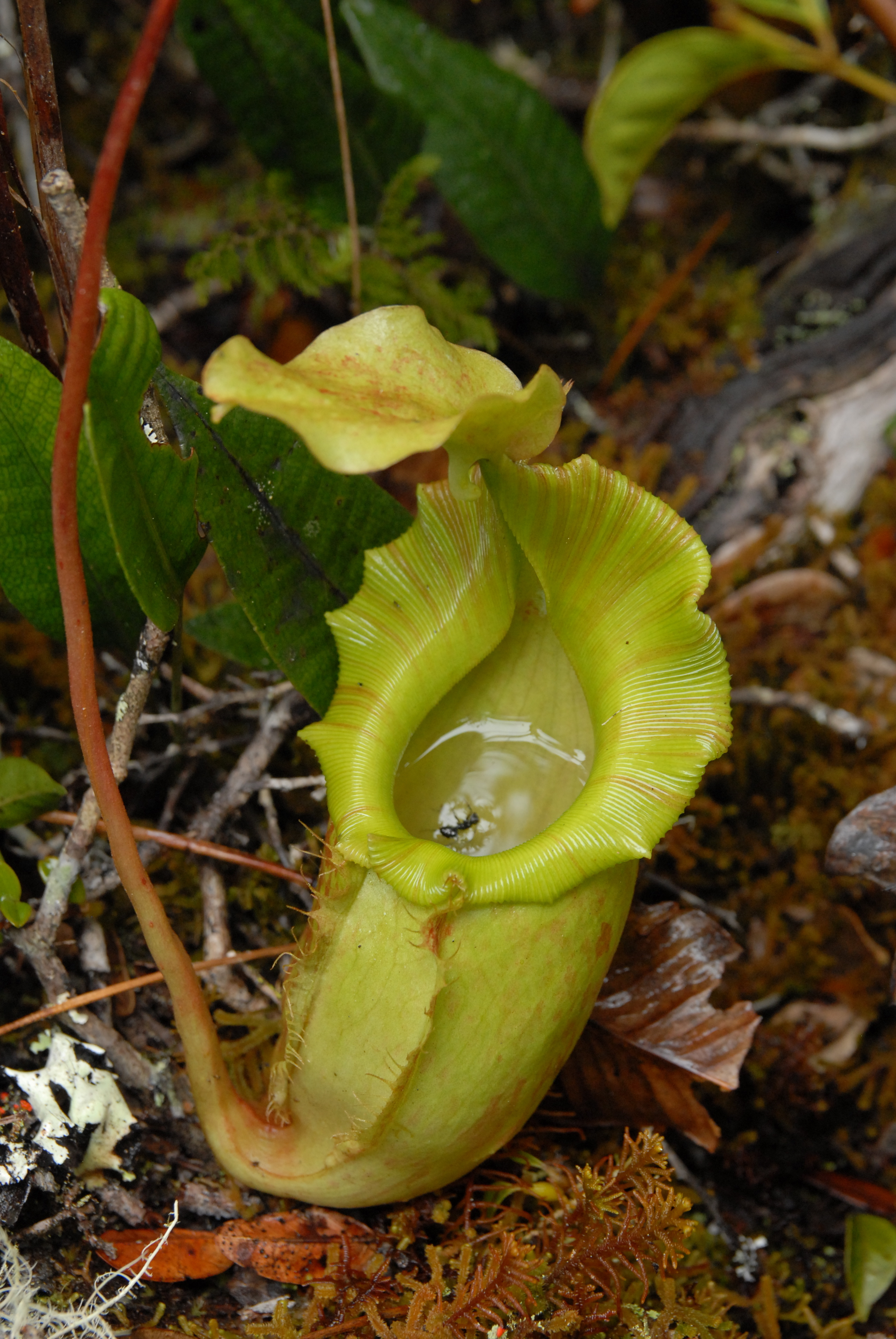

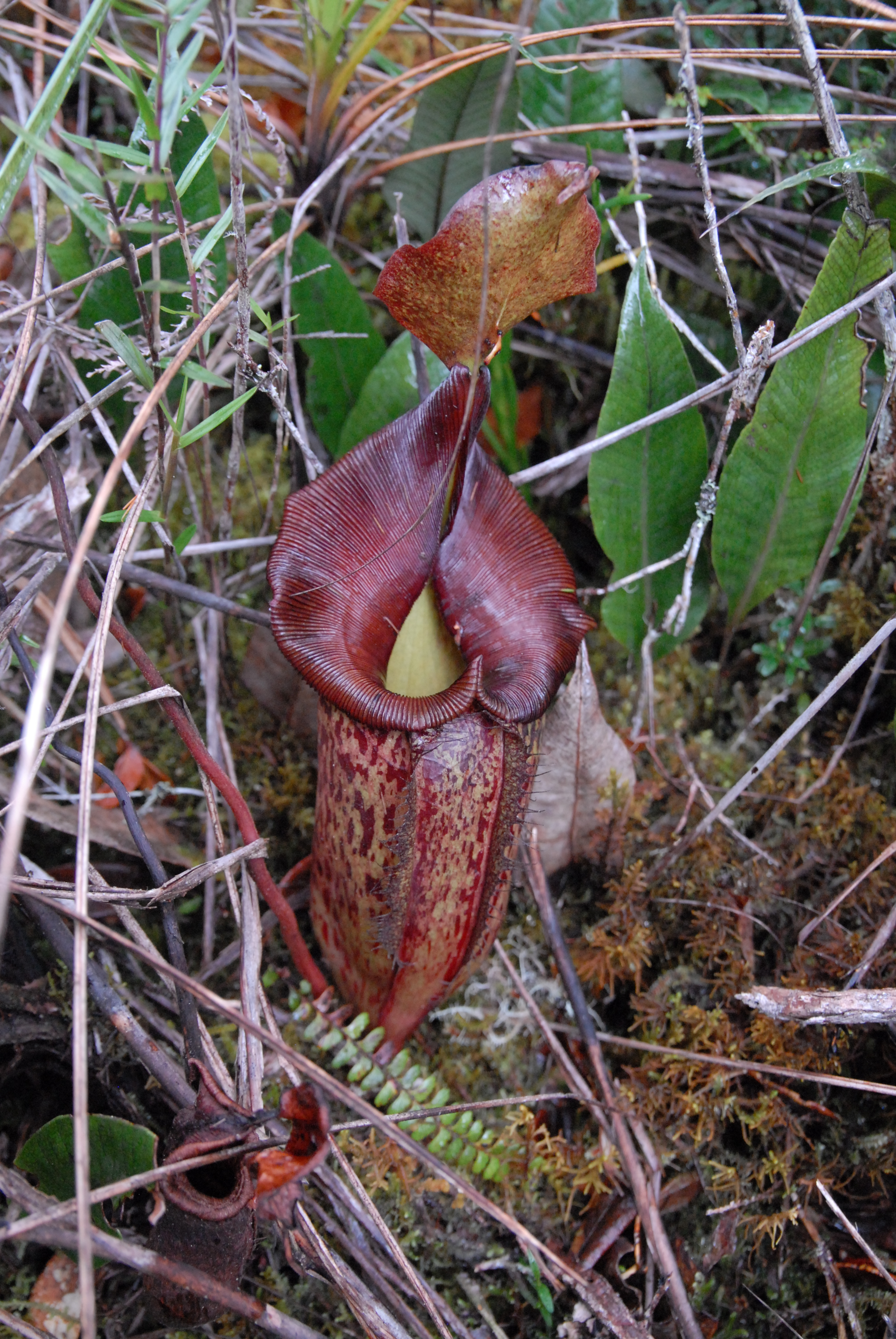

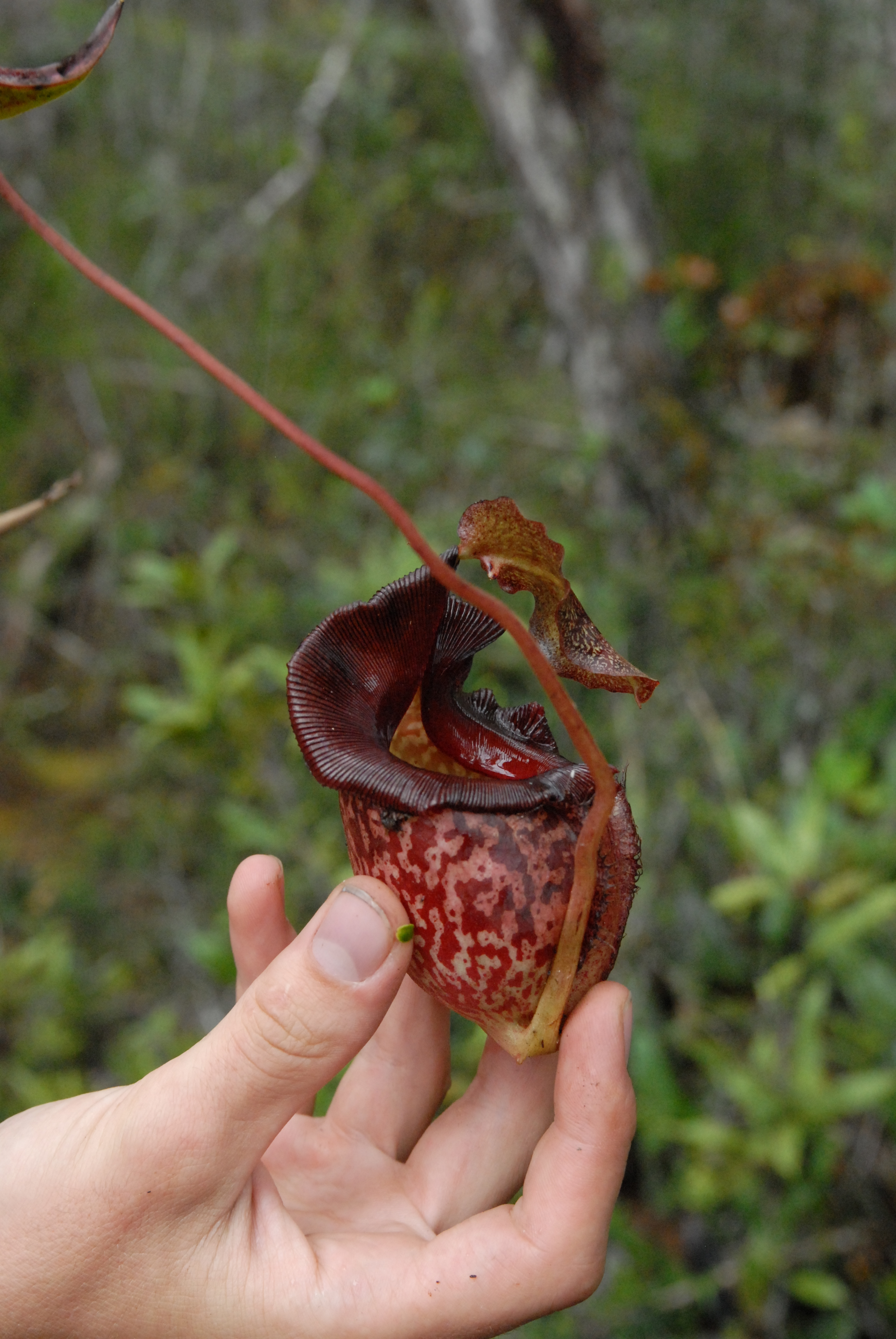

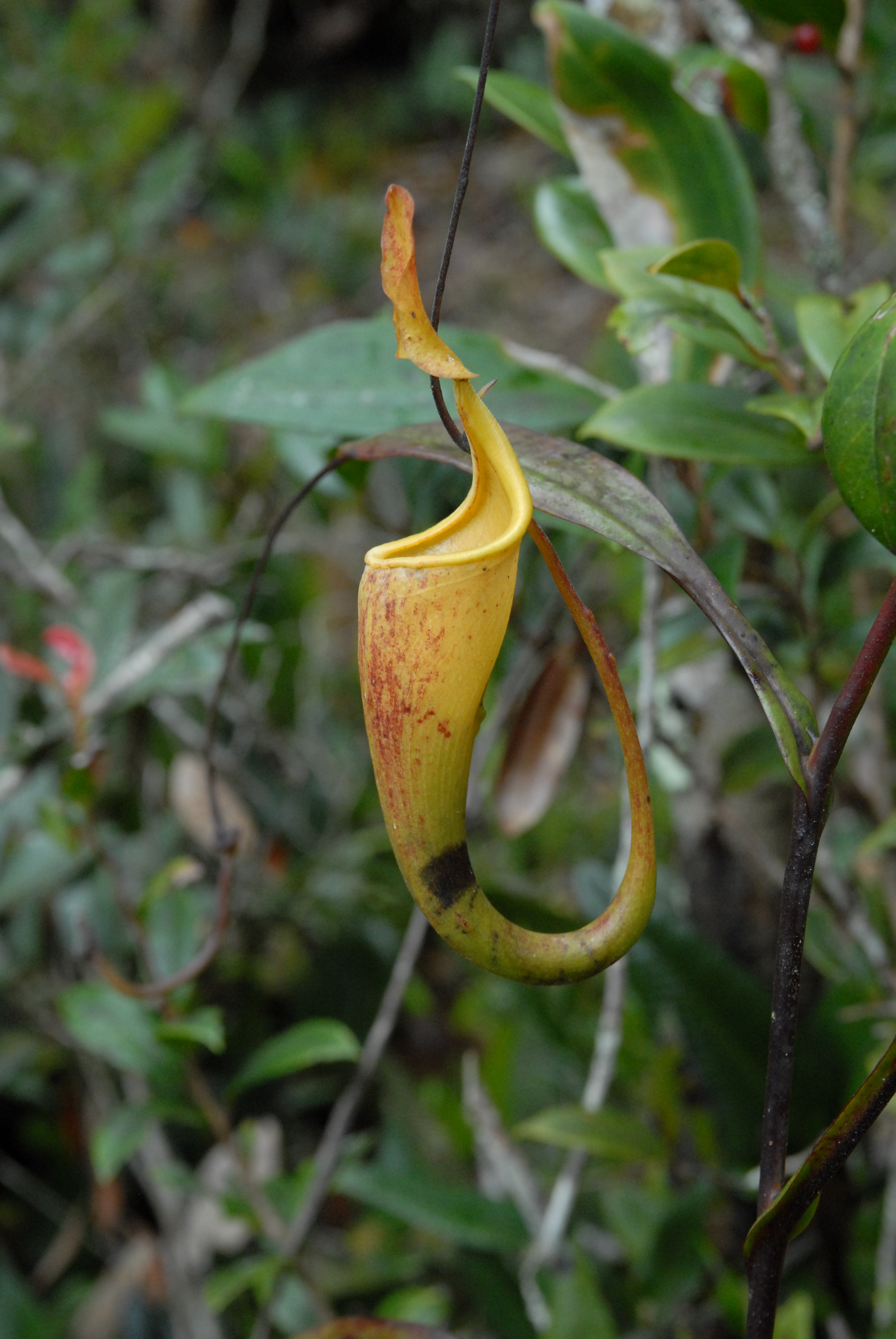

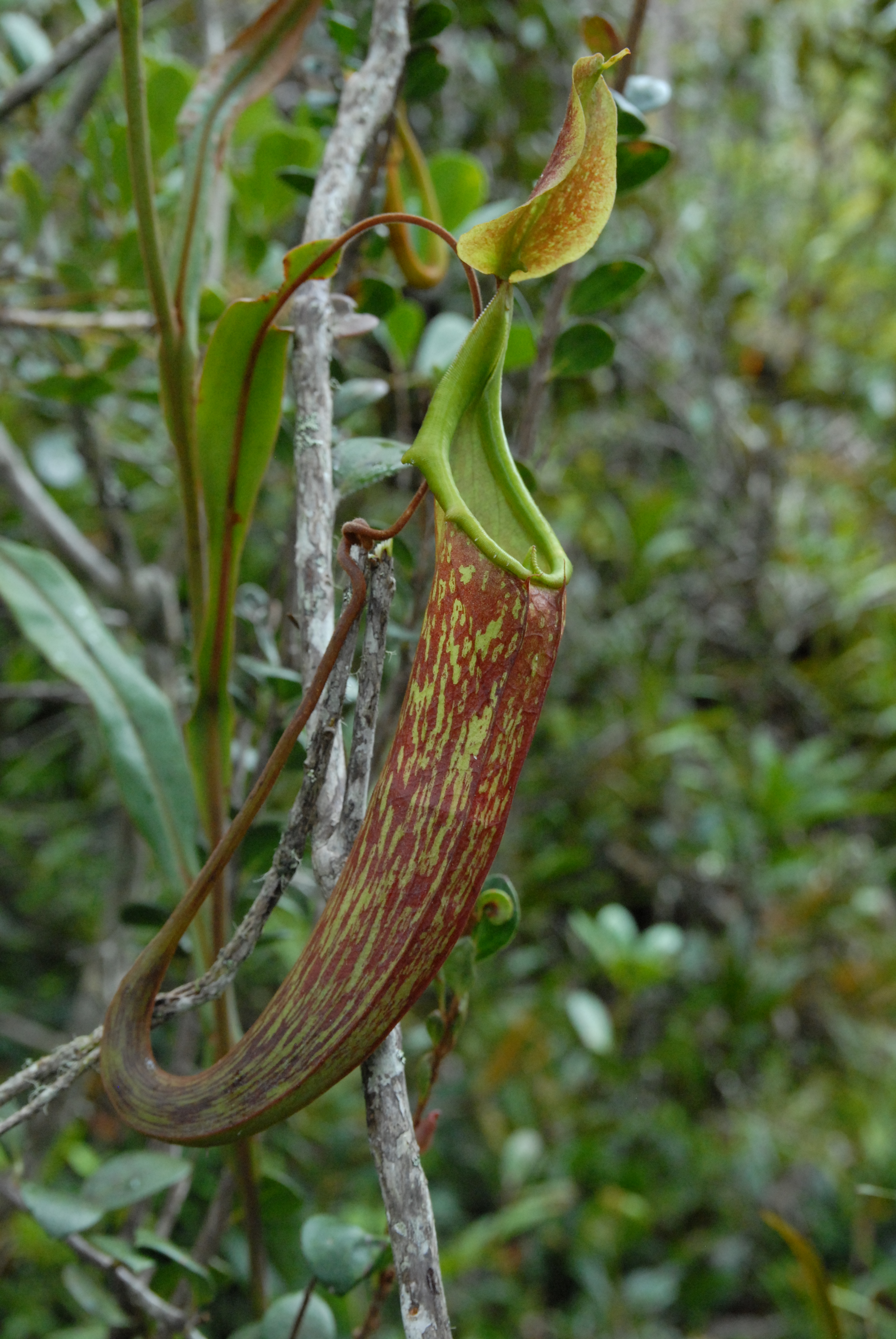

Lower and upper pitchers of various forms of N. maxima from around the Anggi Lakes, West Papua, New Guinea

Certain forms of N. maxima produce distinctly wavy laminar margins, a trait particularly common in plants from Sulawesi. In extreme examples, even the decurrent wings of the leaf—which can extend down the entire length of the stem's internode—may be highly undulate. Such rippled patterns result from increased cell growth near the edges of the leaf, which causes its thin, planar surface to buckle as it assumes the conformation with the lowest energy state.

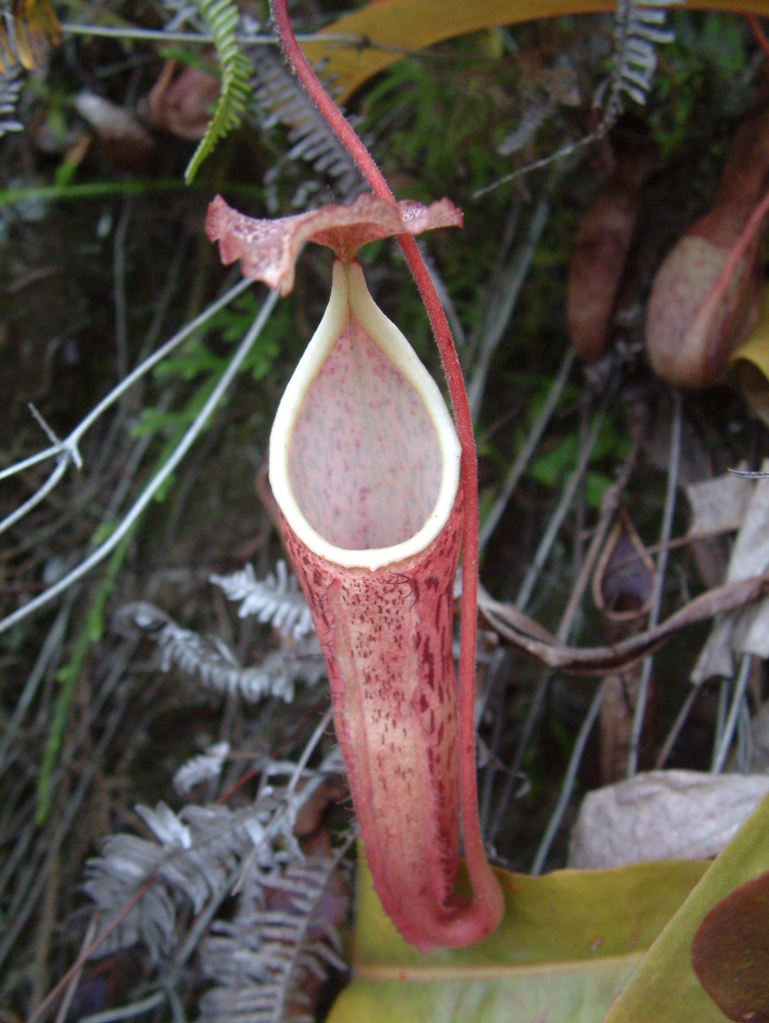

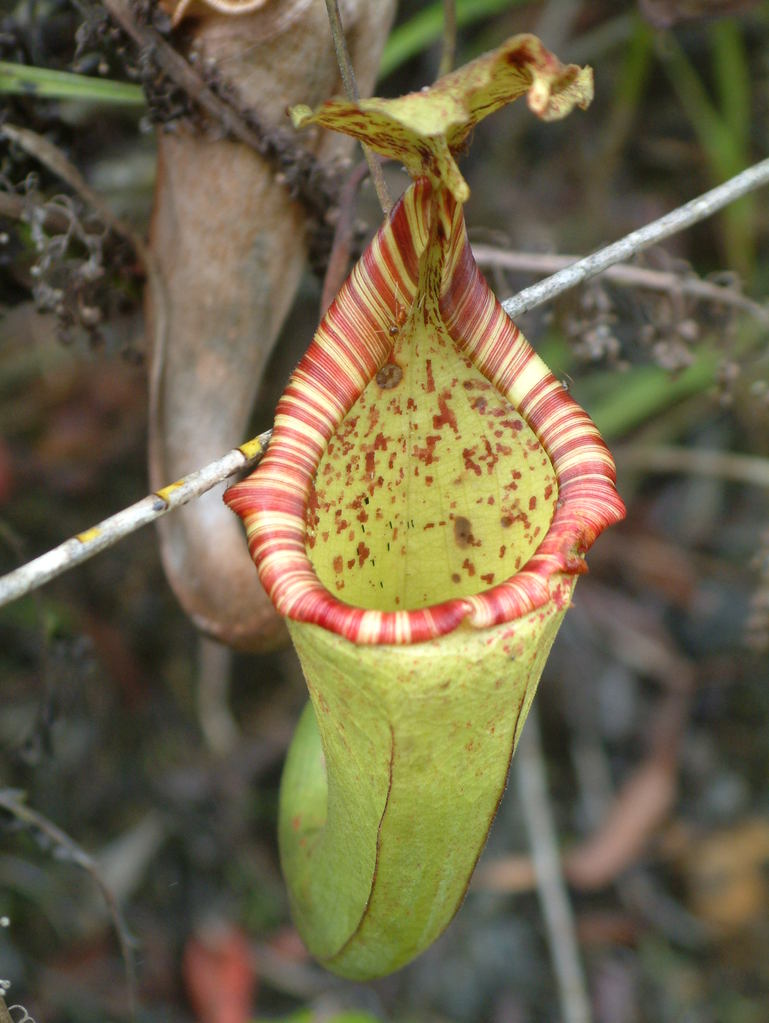

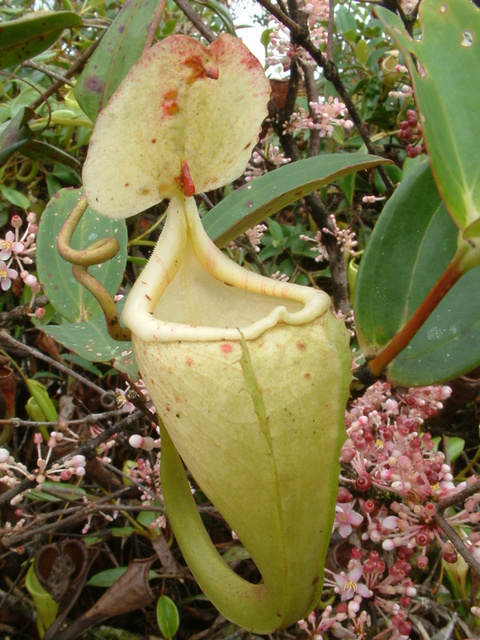

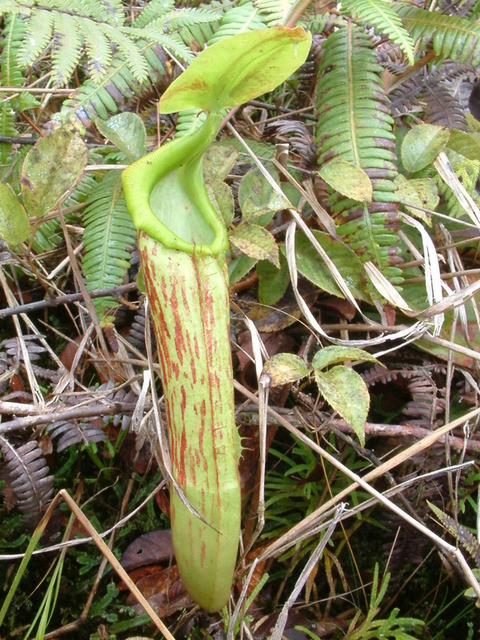

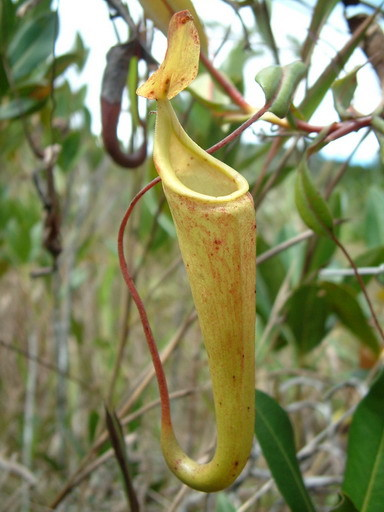

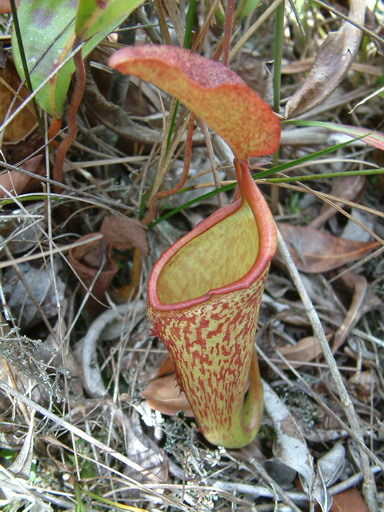

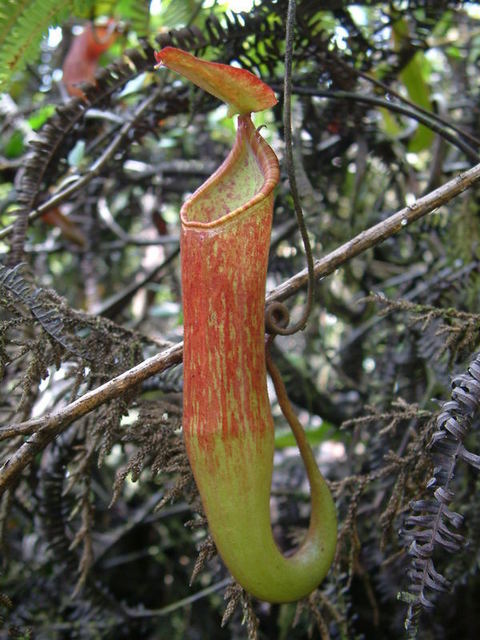

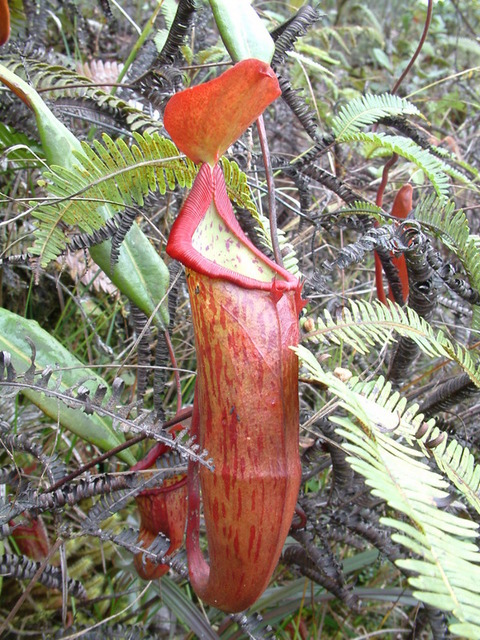

Nepenthes maxima exhibits extraordinary variability across its range, as evident in this selection of upper pitchers produced by plants from (left to right, top to bottom) Sulawesi at 400 m, Sulawesi at 700 m, New Guinea at 1,500 m, New Guinea at 1,600 m, New Guinea at 1,700 m (two pitchers), New Guinea at 2,300 m, and New Guinea at 2,600 m.

== Infraspecific taxa ==
- Nepenthes maxima f. undulata Sh.Kurata, Atsumi & Y.Komatsu (1985)
- Nepenthes maxima var. glabrata Becc. in sched. nom.nud.
- Nepenthes maxima var. lowii (Hook.f.) Becc. (1886) [=N. stenophylla]
- Nepenthes maxima var. minor Macfarl. (1917)
- Nepenthes maxima var. sumatrana (Miq.) Becc. (1886) [=N. sumatrana]
- Nepenthes maxima var. superba (Hort.Veitch ex Marshall) Veitch (1897)

In 2009, a cultivar from Lake Poso in Sulawesi was named Nepenthes maxima 'Lake Poso'. In 2016, this taxon was described as a species in its own right, N. minima.

== Natural hybrids ==
- ? N. eymae × N. maxima
- N. glabrata × N. maxima
- N. klossii × N. maxima
- N. maxima × N. neoguineensis
- N. maxima × N. tentaculata
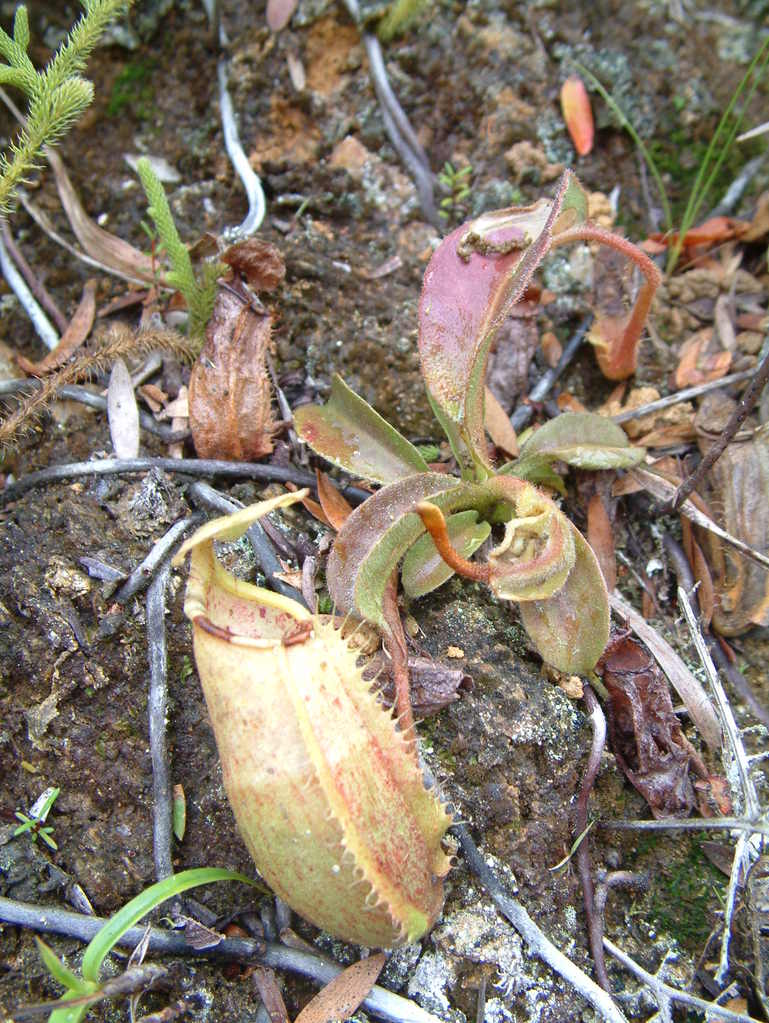
? N. glabrata × N. maxima

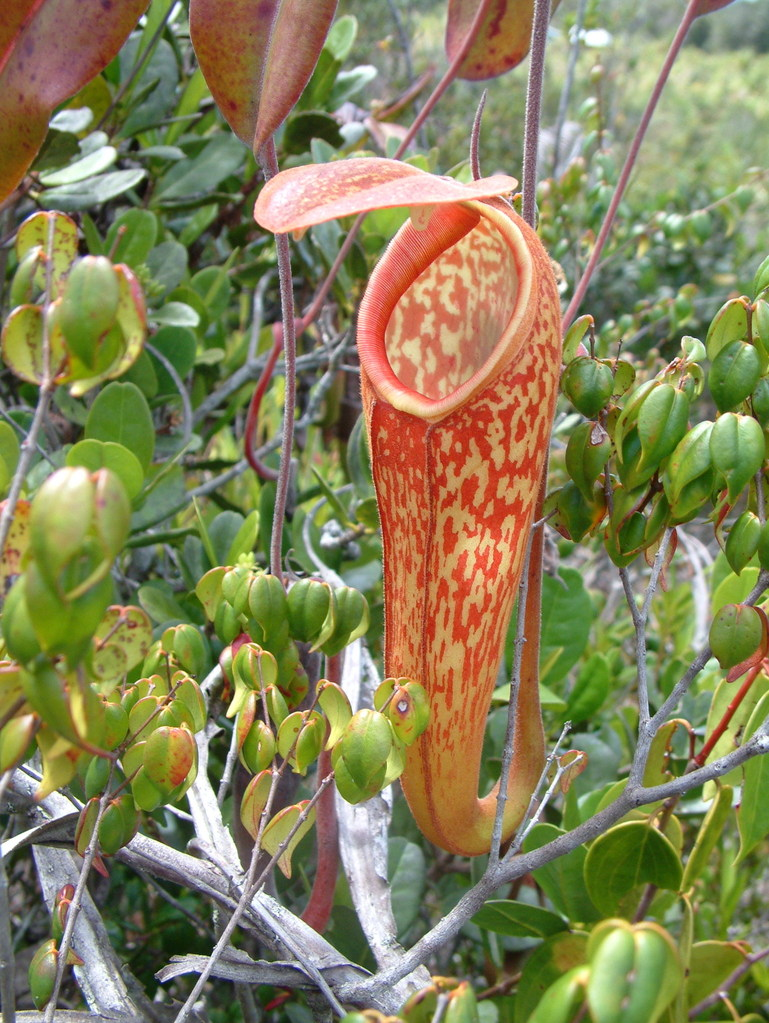
N. klossii × N. maxima

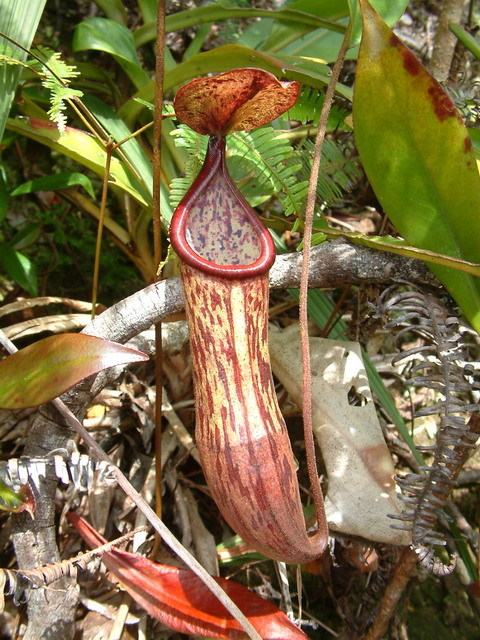
N. maxima × N. neoguineensis
