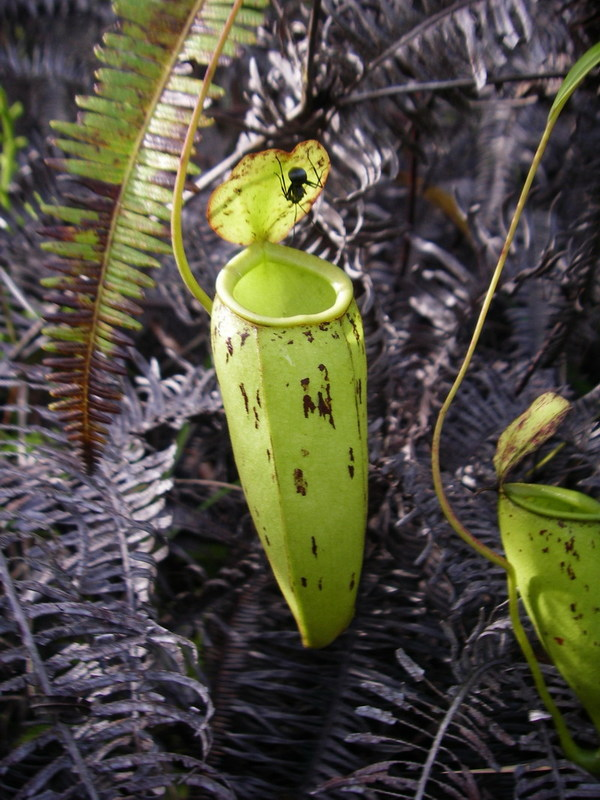
- Upper pitcher of Nepenthes × trichocarpa from Sumatra.

Conservation status
- Least Concern (IUCN 3.1)

Scientific classification
- Kingdom: Plantae
- Clade: Tracheophytes
- Clade: Angiosperms
- Clade: Eudicots
- Order: Caryophyllales
- Family: Nepenthaceae
- Genus: Nepenthes
- Species: N. × trichocarpa

Binomial name
- Nepenthes × trichocarpa Miq. (1858)

Synonyms
- Nepenthes trichocarpa auct. non Miq.: Hort. ex Hort.Bednar in sched. (1993) [=N. distillatoria]

= Nepenthes × trichocarpa =

Species of pitcher plant from Southeast Asia

Nepenthes × trichocarpa (/nɪˈpɛnθiːz ˌtrɪkoʊˈkɑːrpə/; from Greek: trikho- "hair, thread", and -carpus "fruit"), the dainty pitcher-Plant, is a common natural hybrid involving N. ampullaria and N. gracilis. It was originally thought to be a distinct species and was described as such.

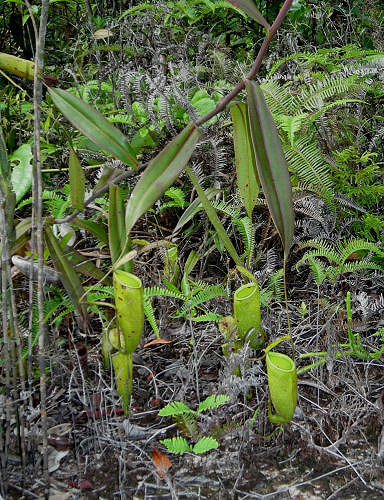
Nepenthes × trichocarpa from Borneo.

B. H. Danser included this plant in his 1928 monograph on the genus Nepenthes. He described the plant as a climbing stem cylindrical in cross-section, and pitchers of the rosettes shortly incurved from the tendril and ovate in form. Both lower and upper pitchers can be up to 8 cm tall, widest at 1/3 of the height, up to 4 cm wide, with two fringed wings over the whole length.

The colour of the pitchers ranges from green to spotted or striped with red or yellow, forming wonderful carpets on the forest floor and dainty upper pitchers scrambling up supporting shrubs and trees.

Nepenthes × trichocarpa is found throughout the lowlands of Peninsular Malaysia, Borneo, Singapore and Sumatra, usually in the company of its parent species, N. ampullaria and N. gracilis. It has also been recorded from southern Thailand and from smaller surrounding islands such as Natuna.

== Infraspecific taxa ==
- Nepenthes trichocarpa var. erythrosticta Miq. (1861)
