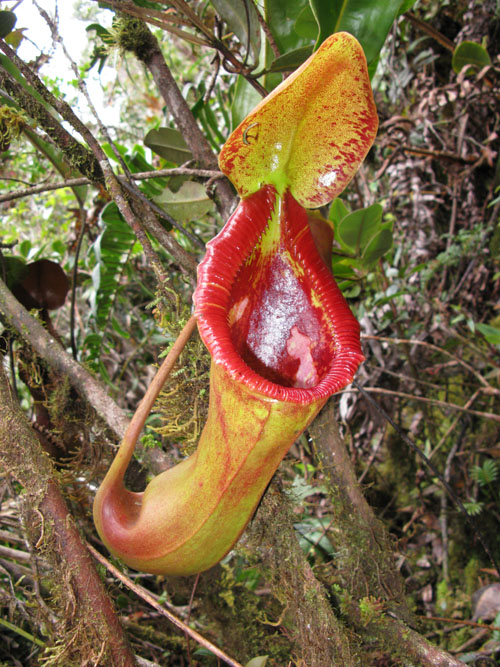
- An upper pitcher of N. × trusmadiensis

Conservation status
- Critically Endangered (IUCN 3.1)

Scientific classification
- Kingdom: Plantae
- Clade: Embryophytes
- Clade: Tracheophytes
- Clade: Angiosperms
- Clade: Eudicots
- Order: Caryophyllales
- Family: Nepenthaceae
- Genus: Nepenthes
- Species: N. × trusmadiensis

Binomial name
- Nepenthes × trusmadiensis Marabini (1983)

= Nepenthes × trusmadiensis =

Species of carnivorous plant

Nepenthes × trusmadiensis (/nɪˈpɛnθiːz ˌtruːsmɑːdiˈɛnsɪs/), or the Trus Madi Pitcher-Plant, is a natural hybrid of two famous Bornean pitcher plant species: N. lowii and N. macrophylla. It is restricted to Mount Trus Madi, where both of its parent species are sympatric.

== Botanical history ==
Nepenthes × trusmadiensis was discovered by Johannes Marabini and John Briggs in 1983. It was described the same year by Marabini. Briggs wrote the following account of its discovery:

We were about to leave the summit around 8.00 a.m. when Johannes Marabini emerged from a dense bush [...] holding two huge pitchers quite unlike any other species. The most striking feature was the sheer size of the pitchers—they were bigger than anything else on Trus Madi. Later on, we were to realise that they were the second biggest pitchers of all the Borneo Nepenthes—exceeded only by those of N. rajah on Kinabalu. [...] The evidence strongly suggested the new pitcher-plant was a hybrid of N. lowii and N. edwardsiana. The great size of the pitchers agreed with this idea—being characteristic of hybrids. There was no time to investigate the distribution of this new plant. So, after collecting a few specimens we set off down the mountain for the three-day trek back to Tambunan.

== Description ==
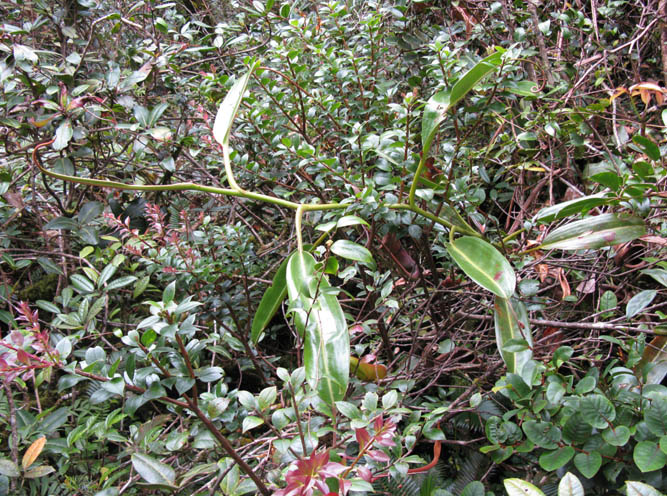
A climbing stem

Nepenthes × trusmadiensis has petiolate leaves measuring up to 50 cm in length. The pitchers of this hybrid are some of the largest of any Bornean Nepenthes species, reaching 35 cm in height. They are roughly intermediate in form between those of its parent species. The lid is held away from the mouth as in N. lowii and bears short bristles on its lower surface. The peristome has prominent ribs and teeth, but is not as developed as that of N. macrophylla. The inflorescence of N. × trusmadiensis may be up to 50 cm long and has two-flowered pedicels. Despite the size of the pitchers, this hybrid is not large in stature.

== Ecology ==
Nepenthes × trusmadiensis is restricted to the summit ridge of Mount Trus Madi and has been recorded from elevations of 2,500 to 2,600 m (8,200 to 8,500 ft) above sea level.
