= Kolopis River =

River in Sabah, Malaysia

The Kolopis River is one of the major rivers that flows through Kinabalu National Park in Sabah, Malaysia. An area adjacent to the upper Kolopis River is home to a number of pitcher plants of the genus Nepenthes, including N. edwardsiana, N. rajah, and N. villosa, as well as two natural hybrids involving these species (N. × harryana and N. × kinabaluensis).
