= Nepenthes of Mount Kinabalu =

- Cover showing N. rajah
- Author: Shigeo Kurata
- Language: English
- Publisher: Sabah National Parks Trustees
- Publication date: 1976
- Media type: Print (softcover)
- Pages: 80
- OCLC: 3791901

Nepenthes of Mount Kinabalu is a monograph by Shigeo Kurata on the tropical pitcher plants of Mount Kinabalu and the surrounding area of Kinabalu National Park in Sabah, Borneo. It was published in 1976 by Sabah National Parks Trustees as the second booklet of the Sabah National Parks series. The monograph is Kurata's most important work on Nepenthes and significantly contributed to popular interest in these plants. It is noted for its high quality colour photographs of plants in habitat. In the book's preface, Kurata writes:

While Nepenthes were often enumerated as an important component of the flora of this mountain, a book on this genus—relating exclusively to Kinabalu had never been published to this date. With such a situation and the interest shown by visitors to the Kinabalu National Park in the genus, Mr. D.V. Jenkins, Assistant Director, Sabah National Parks was prompted to publish a guide book on the species found within the park and I was delighted to be asked to write the text.

The book's coverage was mostly restricted to the southern slopes of Mount Kinabalu, as the rest of the mountain remained largely unexplored at the time.

Kurata recognised 16 species from Mount Kinabalu: N. alata (now known to be endemic to the Philippines), N. ampullaria, N. bicalcarata, N. burbidgeae, N. edwardsiana, N. fusca, N. gracilis, N. lowii, N. mirabilis, N. rafflesiana, N. rajah, N. reinwardtiana, N. stenophylla, N. tentaculata, N. villosa, and an undescribed species ("Nepenthes sp."; later described as N. macrovulgaris). Several of these species had not been reported from Kinabalu National Park at the time, but were expected to be found there due to their presence in surrounding areas. Three named natural hybrids were also covered in detail: N. × harryana, N. × hookeriana, and N. × kinabaluensis, the last of which was named by Kurata for the first time in the book. Nepenthes of Mount Kinabalu also made one of the earliest mentions of N. hamata (under the name N. dentata), a species that would be formally described 8 years after the book's publication.

Nepenthes of Mount Kinabalu was reviewed by Donna Scott in a 1984 issue of the Victorian Carnivorous Plant Society Journal.
