= Marai Parai =

Plateau in Malaysia

Coordinates: 6.0829°N 116.5209°E

Marai Parai

Marai Parai or Marei Parei is a plateau on the northwestern side of Mount Kinabalu, in Malaysia, and part of the Kinabalu Park, with an average elevation of 1,652 metres (5,420 ft). It is accessible through trekking about 5 kilometres (3.1 mi) from the nearest village, Kampung Kiau Nuluh in Kota Belud, with other nearby settlements include Kiau Taburi and Kiau Bersatu. Marai Parai is understood to be entirely ultramafic, with its soils are especially nutrient-poor and waterlogged.

The plateau was named after a sedge species, Tetraria pilisepala. Marai Parai is the Dusun name of the grasses, and denotes the resemblance of the sedge plants such as T. pilisepala and Scirpus subcapitatus, which are very common on the plateau, to hill padi.

== Biodiversity ==
The plant diversity of Marai Parai is derived on its ultramafic composition, with example ultramafic species include Drosera ultramafica. The site is also home to several famous pitcher plant species, including Nepenthes rajah, Nepenthes burbidgeae, Nepenthes lowii, Nepenthes edwardsiana, Nepenthes fusca, and Nepenthes tentaculata. The tree Elaeocarpus inopinatus is known only from the plateau. The 2023 expedition of Marai Parai identified 109 moss species under 62 genera and 26 families at the trail throughout Marai Parai. Several novel Elatostema were discovered in Marai Parai and around Mount Kinabalu in 2004, including one species later named after Marai Parai (E. maraiparaiense).

In terms of fauna, a team under the 2023 expedition counted 70 wildlife species, consisting of various mammals such as the marble cat, sun bear, Sambar deer and wild boars, together with 54 species of birds. Another team counted 26 land snails and slugs, especially under Vitrinula and Microparmarion genera.

== Expeditions ==
The first scientific expedition along Marai Parai was done in 1983. Ever since, several scientific explorations were done to study Marai Parai's features along its trail to Kinabalu's summit spanning about 24 kilometres (15 mi). The latest expedition was in October 2023, consisting of 216 participants, including representatives from government agencies, higher learning institutes, and Sabah Parks, together with local guides. Findings of the expedition are published together in two volumes of Sabah Park's own Sabah Parks Nature Journal in 2024.
