= Mount Trusmadi =

2nd tallest mountain in Malaysia, located in Sabah

- Location within Malaysia

Highest point
- Elevation: 2,642 m (8,668 ft)
- Prominence: 1,703 m (5,587 ft)
- Listing: Ultra; Ribu
- Coordinates: 5°33′N 116°31′E

Naming
- Native name: Gunung Trusmadi (Malay); Nulu Trusmadi (Kadazan Dusun)

Geography
- Location: Interior Division, Sabah, Malaysia
- Parent range: Trusmadi Range

Mount Trusmadi or Trus Madi (Dusun: Nulu Trusmadi, Malay: Gunung Trusmadi) is a mountain located at the Interior Division of Sabah, Malaysia. It is considered as the second highest mountain in both Sabah and Malaysia at 2,642 metres (8,668 ft), after Mount Kinabalu with Trusmadi offering a tougher climbing challenge than the latter. It is located within the Trus Madi Range with an area of 184,527 hectares in total.

== Geology ==
The mountain geology comprises tertiary formation of mudstone, shale and argillite with subordinate beds of quartzite, sandstone, siltstone and limestone breccias.

== Biodiversity ==
The mountain area is located within the Trusmadi Forest Reserve where it supports a wide range of unique flora and fauna, including Nepenthes macrophylla, a species of pitcher plant. The natural hybrid Nepenthes × trusmadiensis is named after the mountain. In 1999, a small-scale expedition on the mountain biodiversity was conducted through a collaboration between Sabah Museum and Louisiana State University Museum of Natural Science with various bird species are found within the area.

The mountain is known for having bird hides since the COVID-19 pandemic, where many come to observe the Bulwer's pheasant as it is one of the few areas where the pheasant has been photographed alongside Maliau Basin and Jungle Girl Entomology Camp. There are approximately 43 species of birds around the hides, and 6 to 15 can be photographed.

== Features ==
It is one of Sabah's ecotourism and mountain climbing destinations. There are three climbing trails towards the mountain summit, namely from Wayaan Kaingaran (Tambunan), Wayaan Mastan (Keningau) and Wayaan Mannan (Sinua, Sook, Keningau). Both Wayaan Kaingaran and Mastan are accessible only with 4WD while Wayaan Mannan has a good access road.

== See also ==
- List of ultras of the Malay Archipelago
