= Kambarangoh =

Kambarangoh or Kamburangau, or Kamborangah, or Kemburongoh is an area along the summit trail to Low's Peak on Mount Kinabalu in Sabah, Borneo. It lies between the Power Station and Layang-Layang at an altitude of about 7,000ft. It shares its name with the only telecommunications station on the mountain, which is owned by Kambarangoh Telecoms.

The road leading up to the Power Station from Kinabalu Park Headquarters is also called Kambarangoh Road.

Alternative spellings have been used at various times - probably because the ridge was not named on any readily available map so explorers had to choose their own spelling.
