= Indumentum =

Covering of hairs or bristles on plant or insect

In biology, an indumentum (Latin, literally: "garment") is a covering of trichomes (fine "hairs") on a plant or of bristles (rarely scales) of an insect.

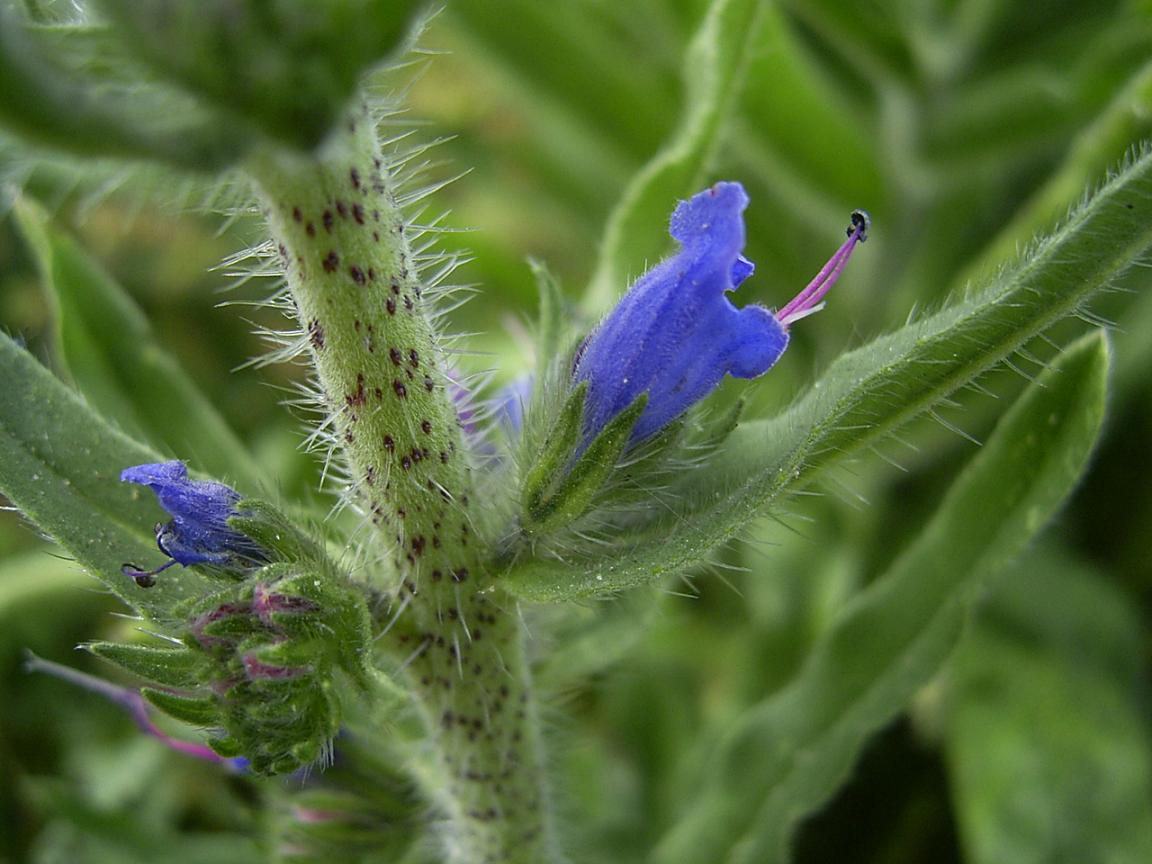
Indumentum of Echium vulgare

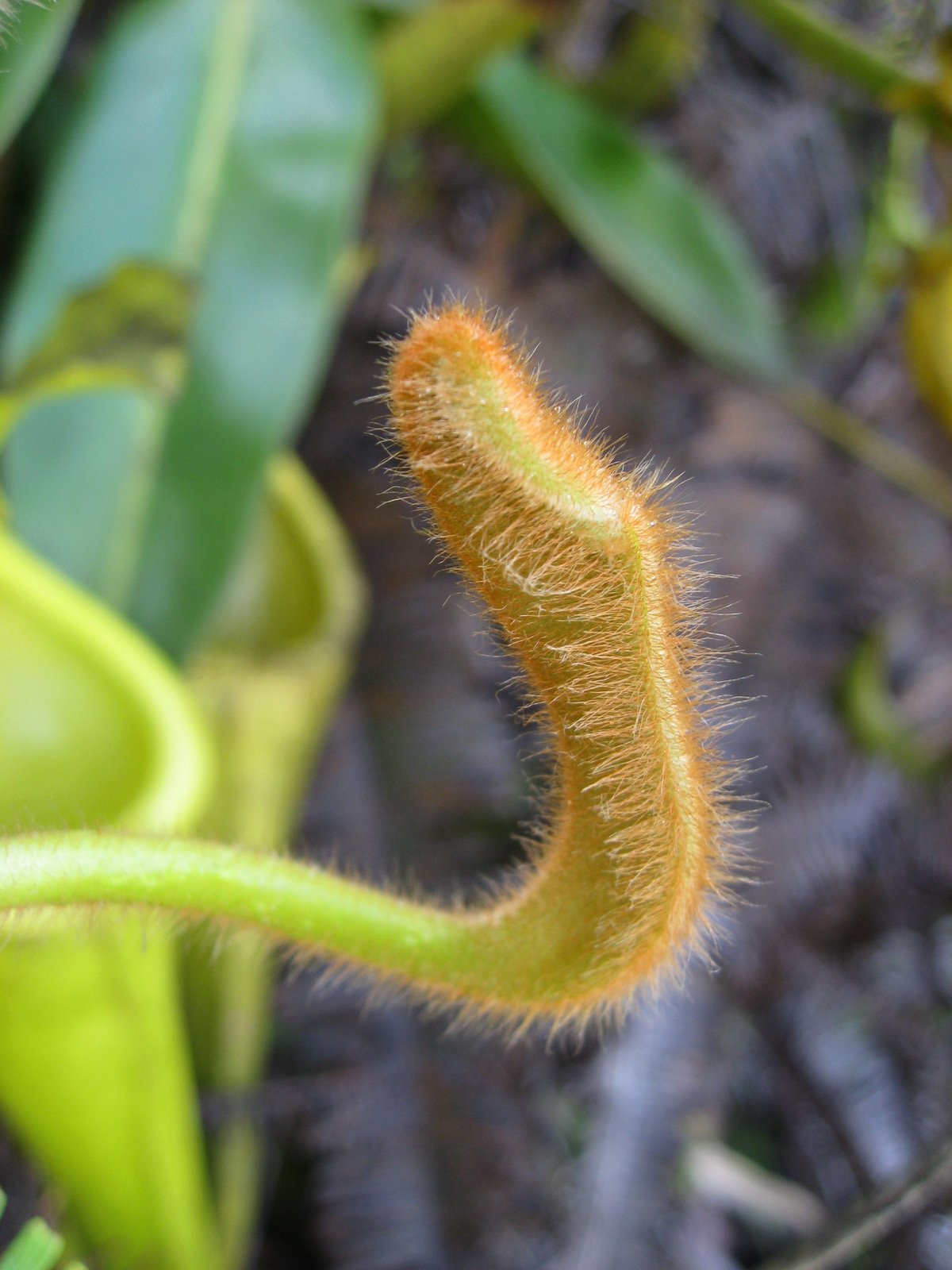
Caducous hairs on a developing pitcher of Nepenthes chaniana

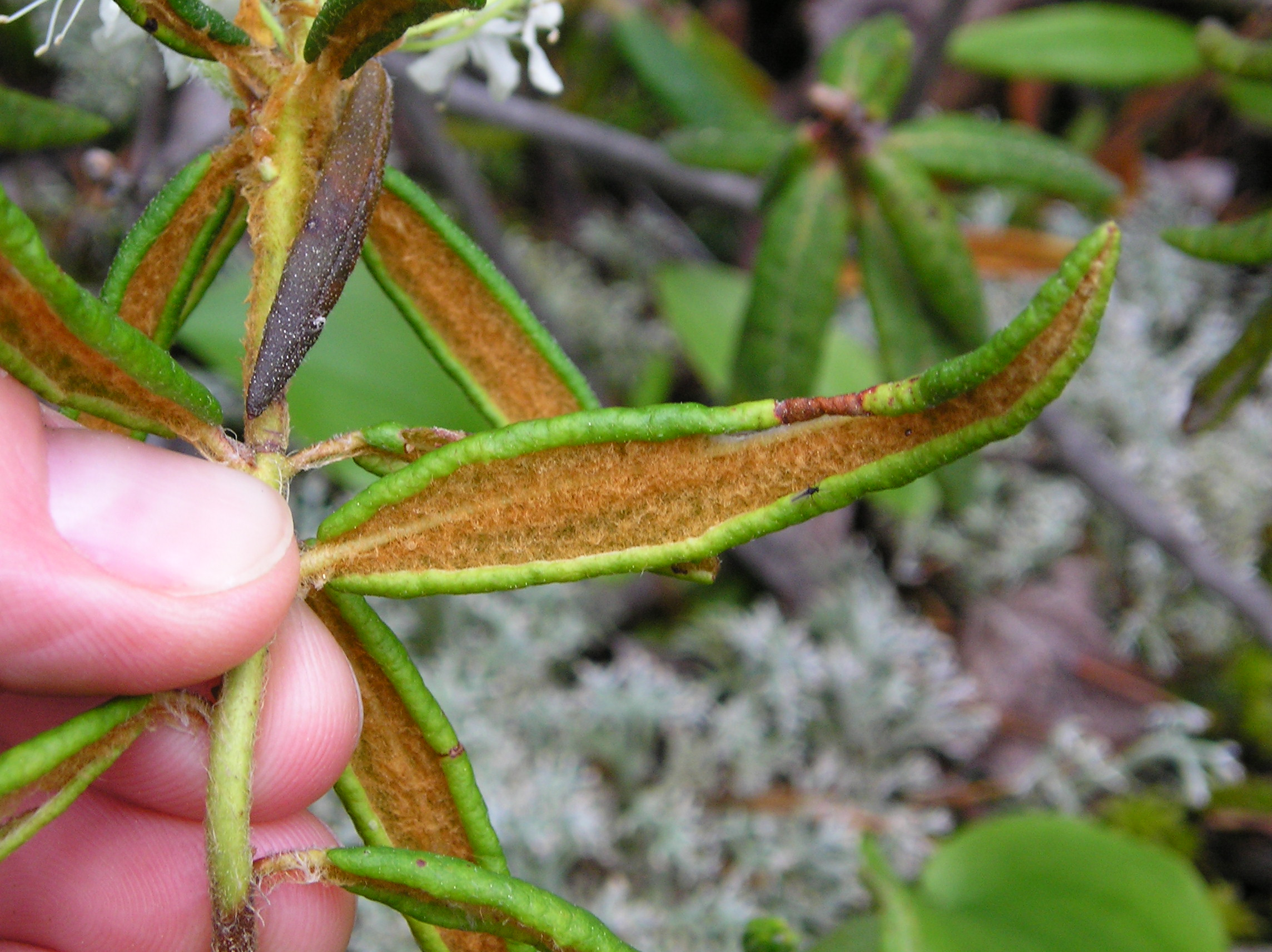
Rust-colored indumentum on the underside of a leaf of the bog Labrador tea (Rhododendron groenlandicum)

== Plants ==
The indumentum on plants can have a wide variety of functions, including as anchorage in climbing plants (e.g., Galium aparine), in transpiration control, in water absorption (Tillandsia), the reflection of solar radiation, increasing water-repellency (e.g., in the aquatic fern Salvinia), in protection against insect predation, and in the trapping of insects (Drosera, Nepenthes, Stylosanthes). Plant indumentum types include

- hirsute
- lanate
- pilose
- pubescent
- scabrous
- scurfy
- stellate
- tomentose
- villous

== Insects ==
The use of an indumentum on insects can be pollen-related as on bees, sensory like whiskers, or for other uses including adhesion and poison.

== See also ==
- Glossary of botanical terms
