= Shigeo Kurata =

Japanese botanist

Shigeo Kurata (倉田 重夫, Kurata Shigeo) is a Japanese botanist and Nepenthes taxonomist whose work in the 1960s and 1970s contributed much to the current popularity of these plants. His best-known work is the 1976 guide Nepenthes of Mount Kinabalu. Nepenthes kurata was named in his honour.

Kurata has described a number of new Nepenthes species, including N. campanulata, N. eymae, N. mindanaoensis, N. peltata, N. rhombicaulis, and N. saranganiensis. He also described N. pyriformis, which was subsequently recognised as a natural hybrid by Charles Clarke. Other natural hybrids named by Kurata include N. × ferrugineomarginata, N. × kinabaluensis, and N. × kuchingensis.
