= Fairbrother =

Fairbrother is a surname. Notable people with the surname include:

- Crawford Fairbrother (1936–1986), Scottish high jumper
- Barrie Fairbrother (born 1950), English football player
- Ben Fairbrother (1973–2024), Canadian football player
- Brian Fairbrother, American soccer coach
- Helen Fairbrother, English winner of the Miss International crown
- Ian Fairbrother (born 1966), English football player
- John Fairbrother (born 1941), English footballer
- Jack Fairbrother (1917–1999), English football goalkeeper
- Jade Fairbrother (born 1986), South African model
- James S. Fairbrother (1851–1901), American politician
- Keith Fairbrother (born 1944), English chairman and rugby union player of Coventry RFC
- Kelsi Fairbrother (born 1989), British handball player
- Lloyd Fairbrother (born 1991), English rugby player
- Meegwun Fairbrother, Canadian actor
- Nan Fairbrother (1913–1971), English writer and lecturer on landscape and land use
- Neil Fairbrother (born 1963), English cricket player
- Nicola Fairbrother (born 1970), judoka from England
- Russell Fairbrother, New Zealand lawyer and politician
- Sarah Fairbrother (1816–1890), English actress and the mistress of Prince George, Duke of Cambridge
- Simon Fairbrother (born 1986), British middle-distance runner
- Sydney Fairbrother (1872–1941), British actress
- Tim Fairbrother (born 1982), New Zealand rugby union player
- Tony Fairbrother (1926–2004), English aeronautical engineer
- William Fairbrother, Canadian ice hockey player

== See also ==
- Fairbrothers
