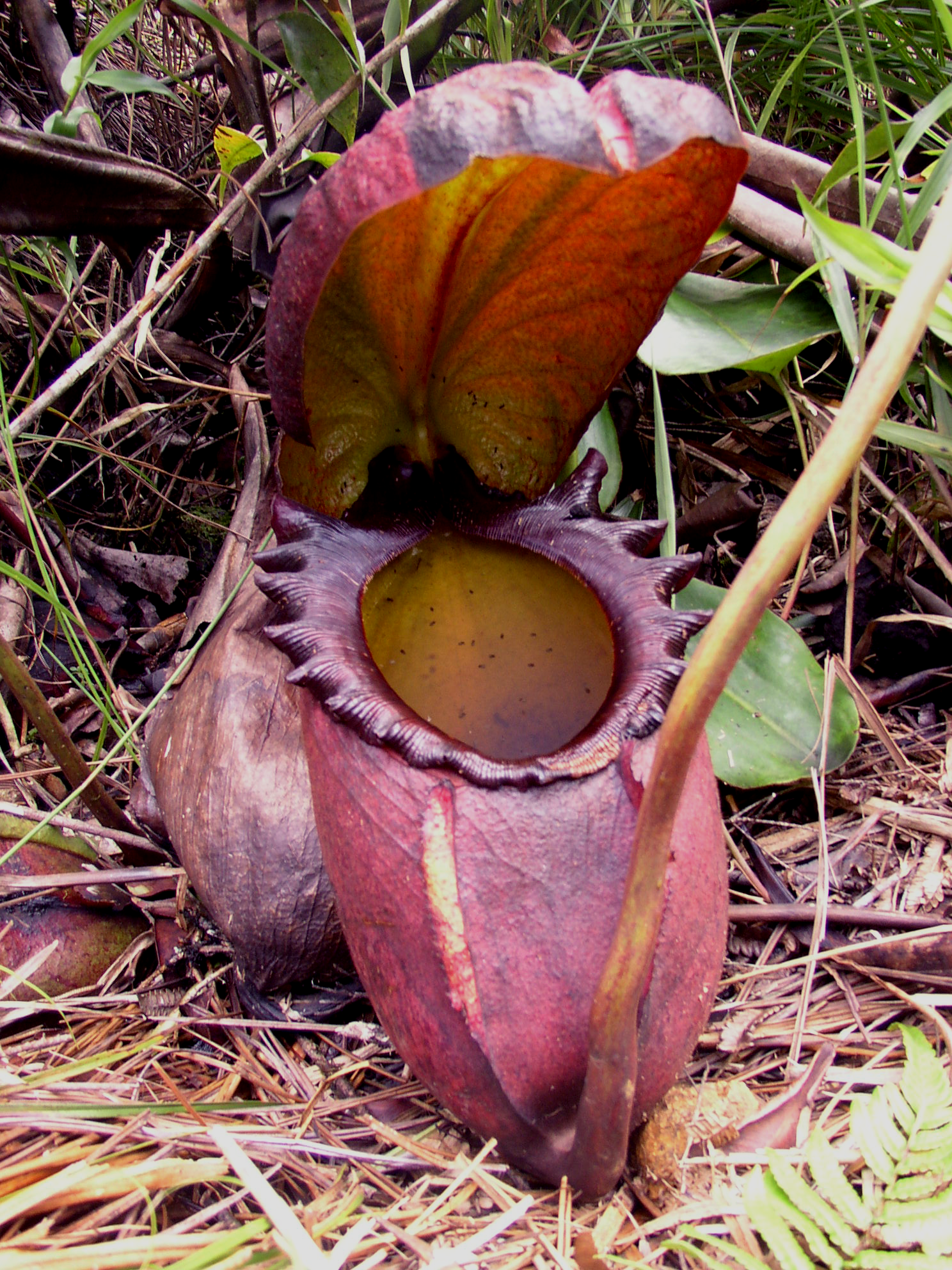
- Large lower pitcher. Mount Kinabalu, Borneo.
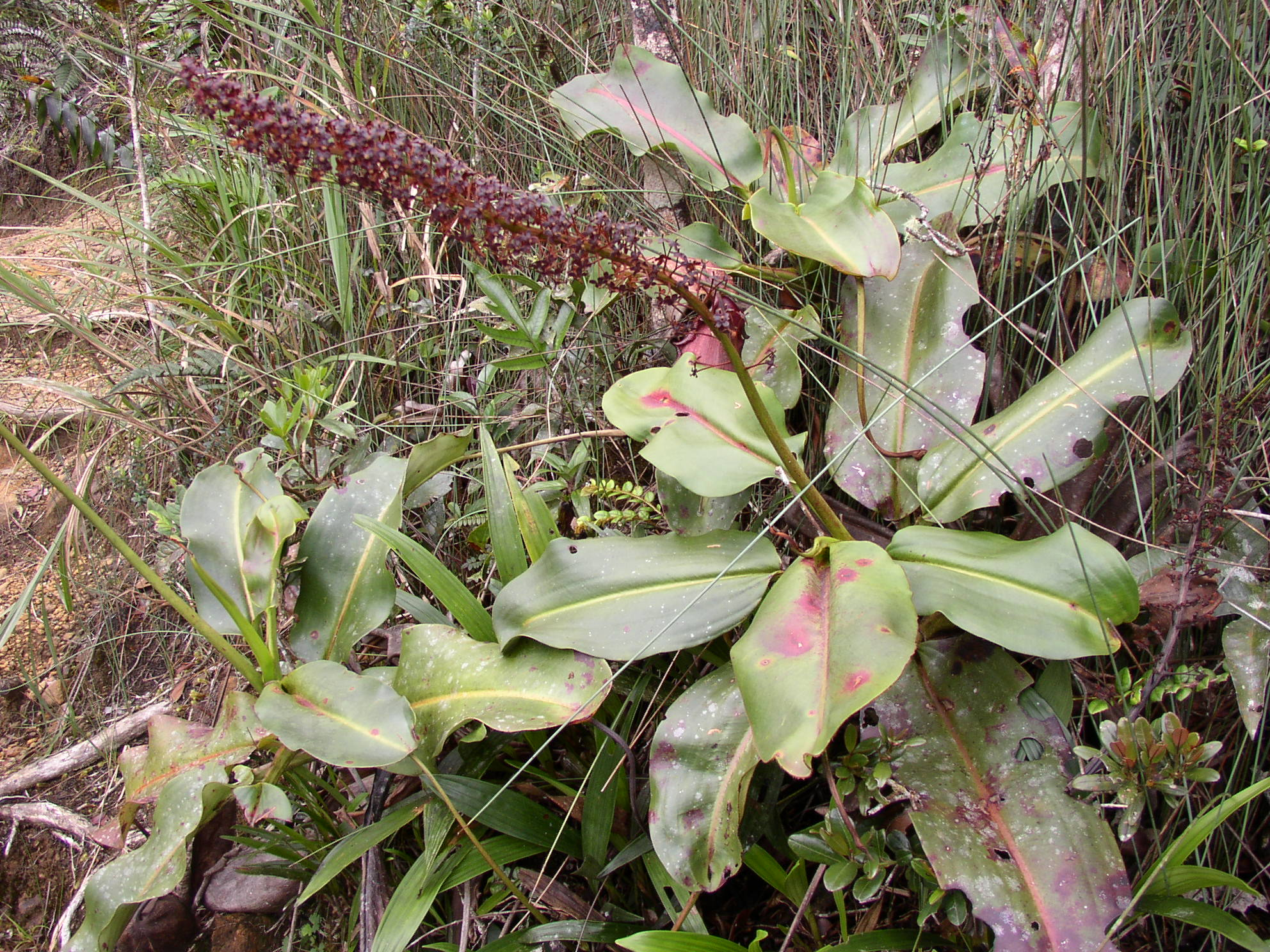
- In flower

Conservation status
- Endangered (IUCN 2.3)
- CITES Appendix I

Scientific classification
- Kingdom: Plantae
- Clade: Tracheophytes
- Clade: Angiosperms
- Clade: Eudicots
- Order: Caryophyllales
- Family: Nepenthaceae
- Genus: Nepenthes
- Species: N. rajah

Binomial name
- Nepenthes rajah Hook.f. (1859)
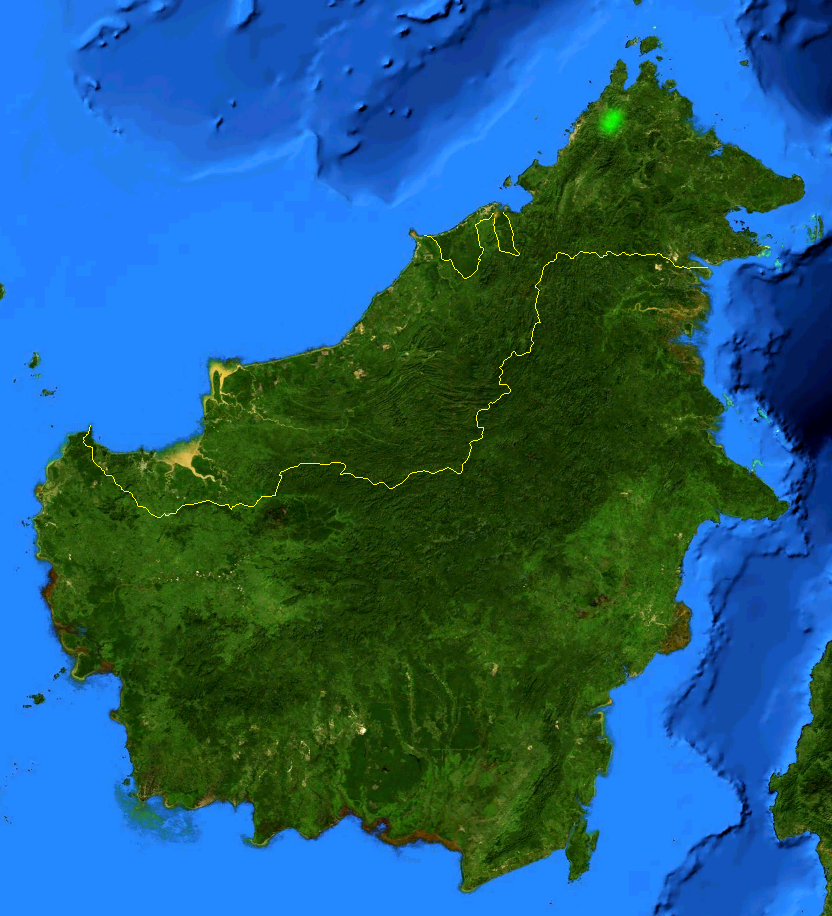
- Borneo, showing natural range highlighted in green.

Synonyms
- Heterochresonyms: Nepenthes rajah auct. non Hook.f.: A.Slack (1986) [=Nepenthes × alisaputrana]; Nepenthes rajah auct. non Hook.f.: G.Cheers (1992) [=Nepenthes × kinabaluensis]

= Nepenthes rajah =

Species of pitcher plant from Borneo

Nepenthes rajah /nɪˈpɛnθiːz ˈrɑːdʒə/ is a carnivorous pitcher plant species of the family Nepenthaceae. It is endemic to Mount Kinabalu and neighbouring Mount Tambuyukon in Sabah, Malaysian Borneo. Nepenthes rajah grows exclusively on serpentine substrates, particularly in areas of seeping ground water where the soil is loose and permanently moist. The species has an altitudinal range of 1,500–2,650 m (4,920–8,690 ft) above sea level and is thus considered a highland or sub-alpine plant. Due to its localised distribution, N. rajah is classified as an endangered species by the IUCN and listed on CITES Appendix I.

The species was collected by Hugh Low on Mount Kinabalu in 1858, and described the next year by Joseph Dalton Hooker, who named it after James Brooke, the first White Rajah of Sarawak. Since being introduced into cultivation in 1881, it has always been a sought-after species, although costly and hard to cultivate. Tissue culture has allowed it to become more widespread in cultivation.

N. rajah is best known for the giant urn-shaped traps it produces, which can grow up to 41 cm (16 in) high and 20 cm (7.9 in) wide. These are capable of holding 3.5 L (0.92 US gal) of water and in excess of 2.5 L (0.66 US gal) of digestive fluid, making them probably the largest in the genus.

N. rajah can trap mammals as large as rats. N. rajah occasionally traps small vertebrates such as frogs, lizards, and even birds. Insects, and particularly ants, are its staple prey. The pitchers are host to many other organisms, some so specialised that they cannot survive anywhere else, and are called nepenthebionts. N. rajah has two such mosquito taxa named after it: Culex rajah and Toxorhynchites rajah. The species is able to hybridise in the wild with all other locally occurring Nepenthes species.

== Etymology ==
Joseph Dalton Hooker described Nepenthes rajah in 1859, naming it in honour of James Brooke, the first White Rajah of Sarawak. 'Rajah Brooke's Pitcher Plant' is an accurate, but seldom-used common name. N. rajah is sometimes called the 'Giant Malaysian Pitcher Plant' or simply 'Giant Pitcher Plant', although the binomial name remains by far the most popular way of referring to this species. The specific epithet rajah means "King" in Malay and this, coupled with the impressive size of its pitchers, has meant that N. rajah is often called the "King of Nepenthes".

== Plant characteristics ==
Nepenthes rajah is a scrambling vine. The stem usually grows along the ground, but climbs whenever it comes into contact with a suitable support. The stem is up to 30 mm (1.2 in)) thick and may reach up to 6 m (20 ft) in length, although it rarely exceeds 3 m (9.8 ft). The leaves are distinctive and reach a large size. They are leathery in texture with a wavy outer margin. The leaves are characteristically peltate, whereby the tendril joins the lamina on the underside, before the apex. The tendrils are inserted within 5 cm (2.0 in) below the leaf apex and reach a length of approximately 50 cm (20 in).

=== Pitchers ===
The pitcher is a trap consisting of the main pitcher cup, covered by an operculum or lid. A reflexed ring of hardened tissue, the peristome, surrounds the entrance. N. rajah produces two distinct types of trap. "Lower" or "terrestrial" pitchers, the most common, are very large, richly coloured, and ovoid in shape. Exceptional specimens may be more than 40 cm (16 in) in length and hold 3.5 L (0.92 US gal) of water and over 2.5 L (0.66 US gal) of digestive fluid, although most do not exceed 200 ml (6.8 U.S. fl oz). The lower pitchers rest on the ground. They are usually red to purple on the outside, lime green to purple on the inside. Mature plants may in addition produce much smaller "upper" or "aerial" pitchers, which are funnel-shaped, and usually more colourful. The tendril attachment is normally at the rear of the pitcher cup. True upper pitchers are rare, as the stems rarely attain lengths greater than a few metres before dying off.

The peristome has a distinctive scalloped edge and is greatly expanded, forming a red lip around the trap's mouth. A series of raised ribs intersect the peristome, ending in short, sharp teeth that line its inner margin. The inner portion of the peristome accounts for around 80% of its total cross-sectional surface length. The huge, vaulted lid is a distinguishing feature of this species. It is ovate to oblong in shape with a distinct keel down the middle, and two prominent lateral veins. The spur at the back of the lid is approximately 20 mm (0.79 in) long and unbranched.

The plant has very large nectar-secreting glands covering its pitchers. The inner surface of the pitcher is wholly glandular, with 300 to 800 glands/cm^{2} (1,900 to 5,200 glands/in^{2}).

=== Flowers ===
N. rajah seems to flower at any time of the year. Flowers are produced in large numbers on inflorescences that arise from the apex of the main stem. N. rajah produces a very large inflorescence that can be 80 cm (31 in), and sometimes even 120 cm (47 in) tall. The individual flowers of N. rajah are produced mainly in pairs on reduced partial peduncles and so the inflorescence appears superficially like a raceme, though it is technically a racemose panicle, that is, a panicle with branching so greatly reduced as to appear raceme-like. The flowers are reported to give off a strong sugary smell and are brownish-yellow in colour. Sepals are elliptic to oblong and up to 8 mm (0.31 in) long. Like all Nepenthes species, N. rajah is dioecious, which means that individual plants produce flowers of a single sex. Fruits are orange-brown and 10 to 20 mm (0.39 to 0.79 in) long. A study of 300 pollen samples taken from a herbarium specimen (J.H.Adam 2443, collected at an altitude of 1,930–2,320 m (6,330–7,610 ft)) found the mean pollen diameter to be 34.7 μm (0.00137 in) (SE=0.3; CV=7.0%).

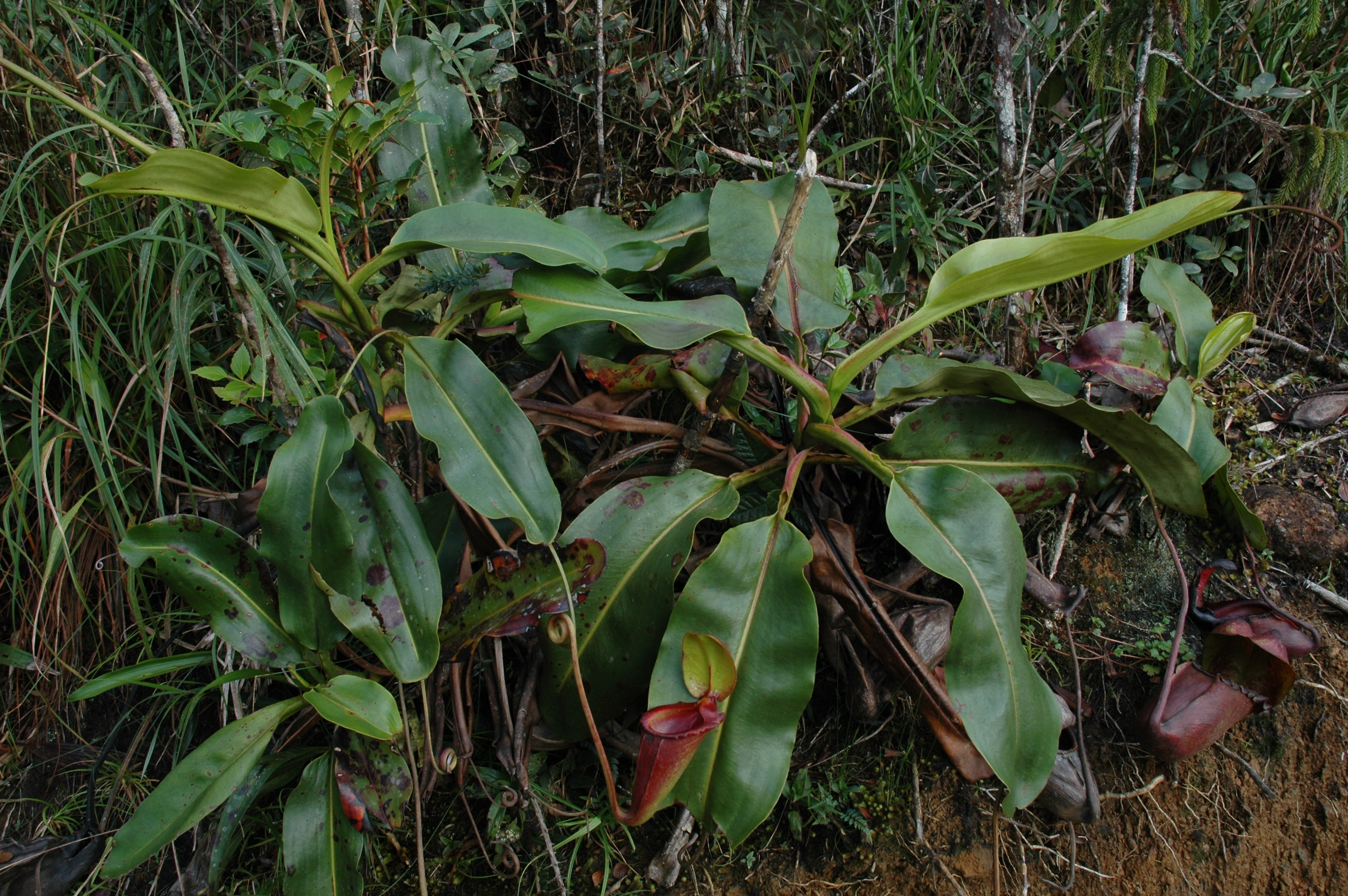
Mature plants with both lower and upper pitchers

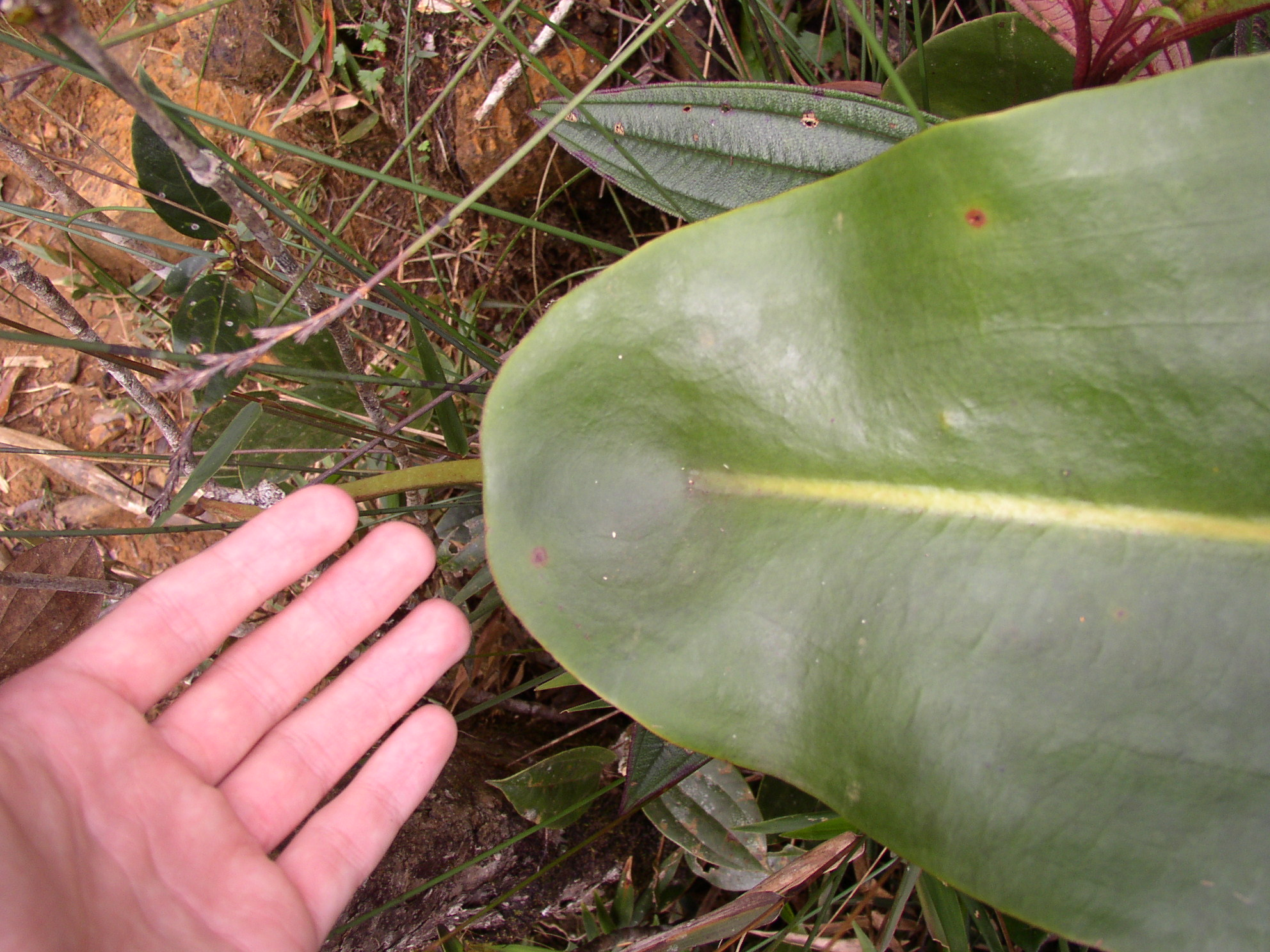
The peltate leaf attachment

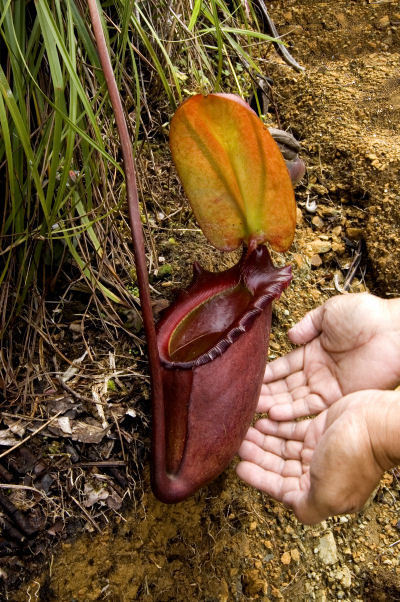
A terrestrial pitcher

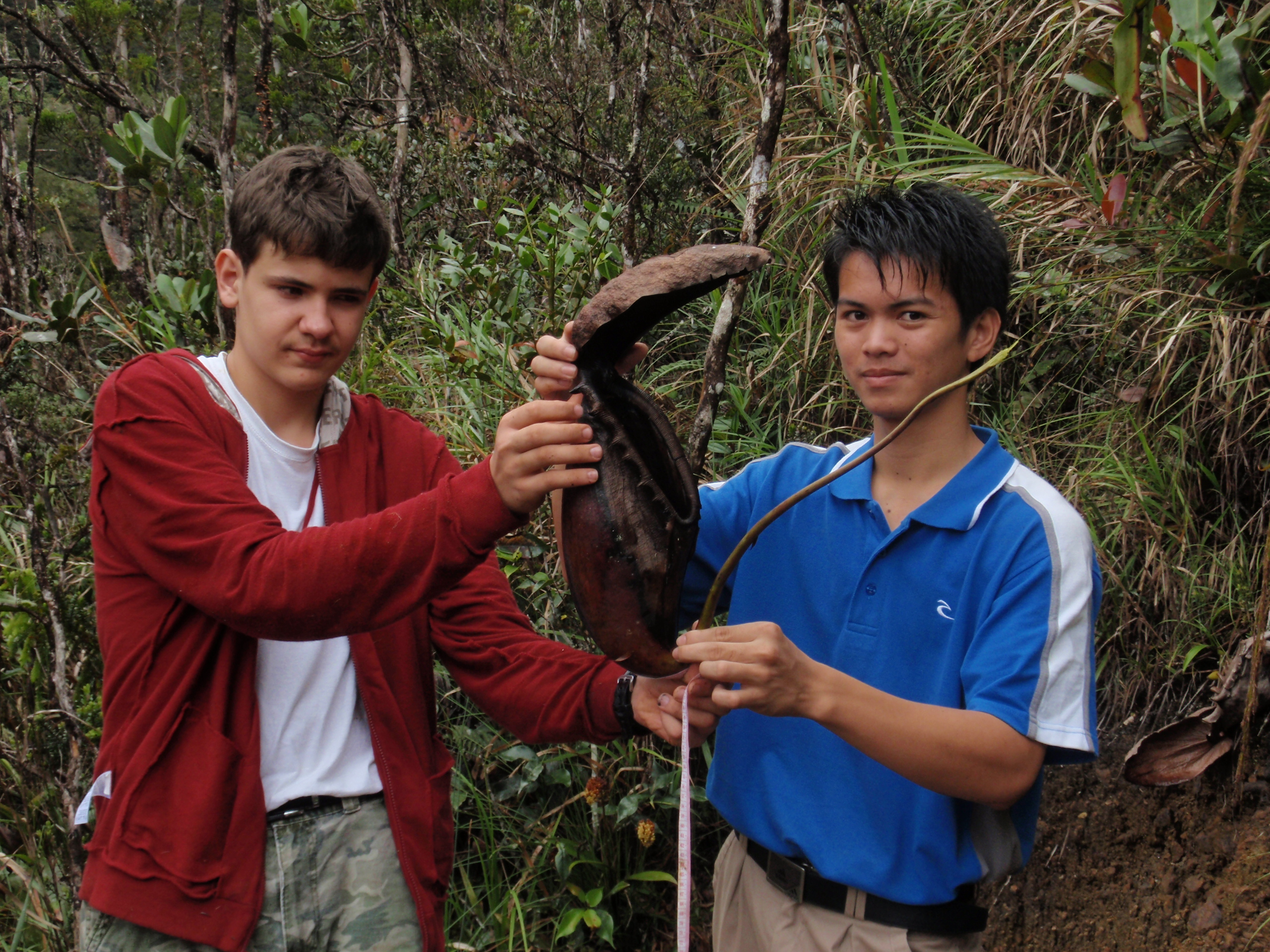
The 41 cm (16 in) pitcher found on The Sabah Society's March 2011 trip to Mesilau

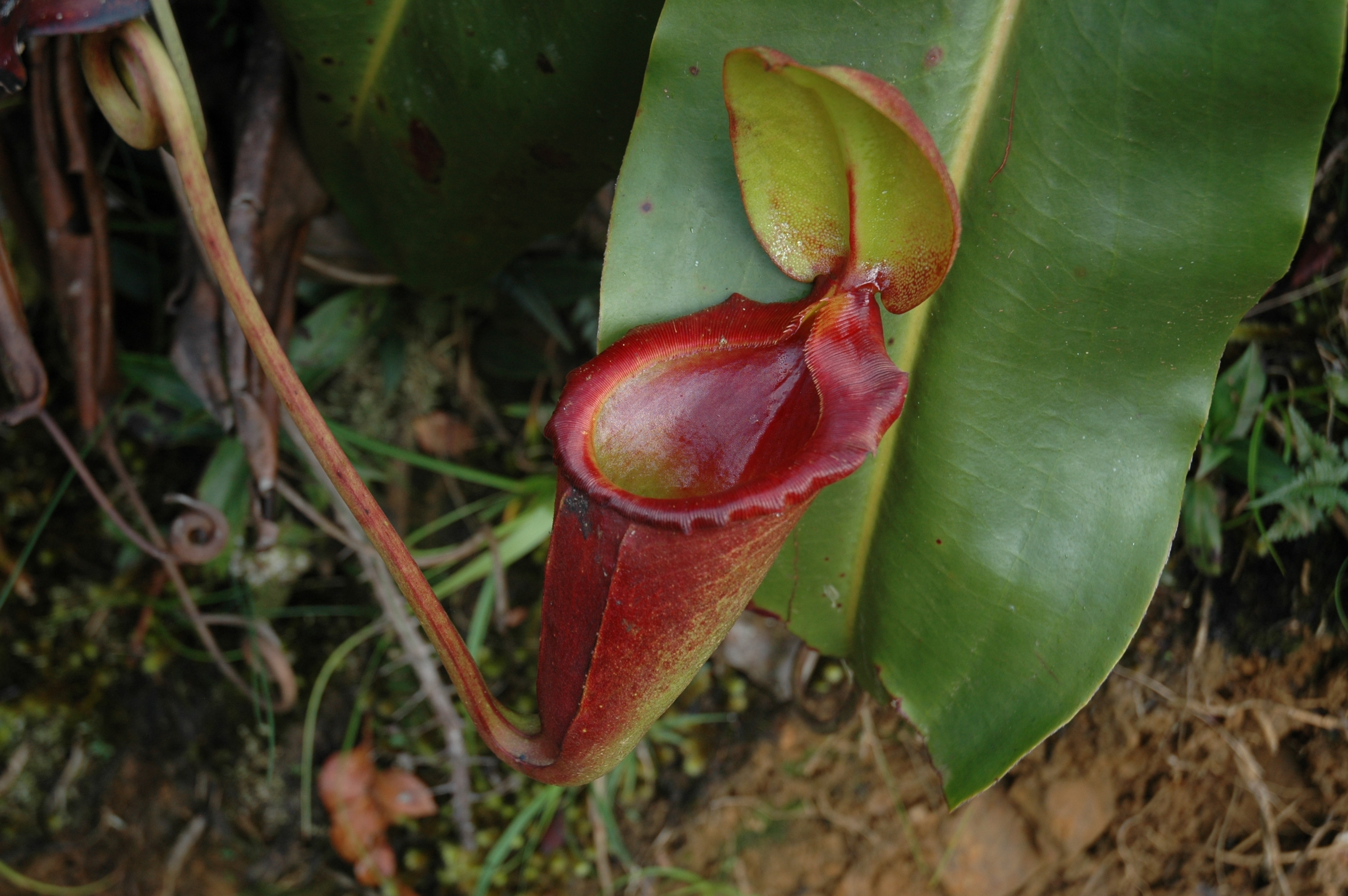
A rare aerial pitcher

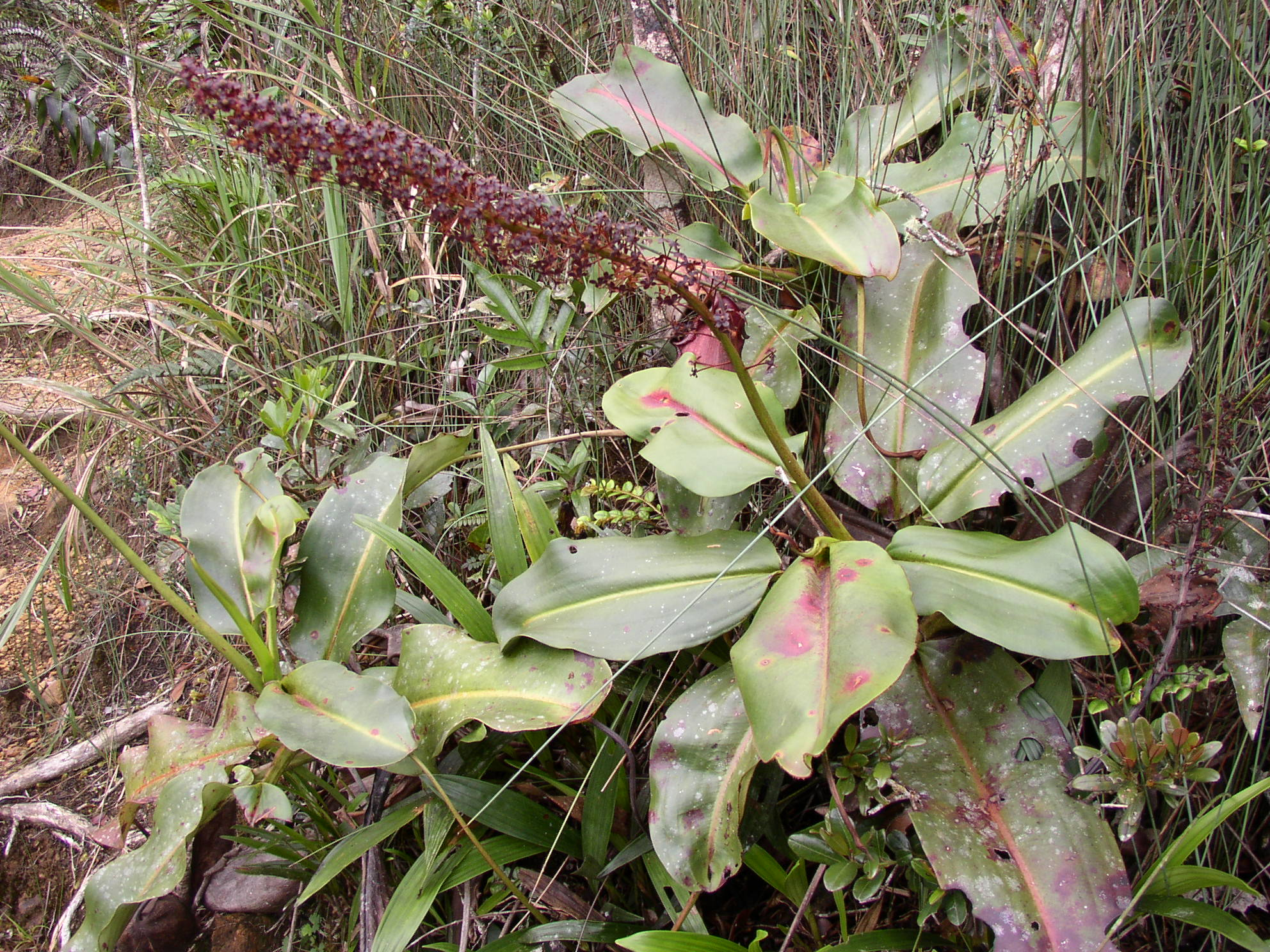
Plant in flower

== Carnivory ==
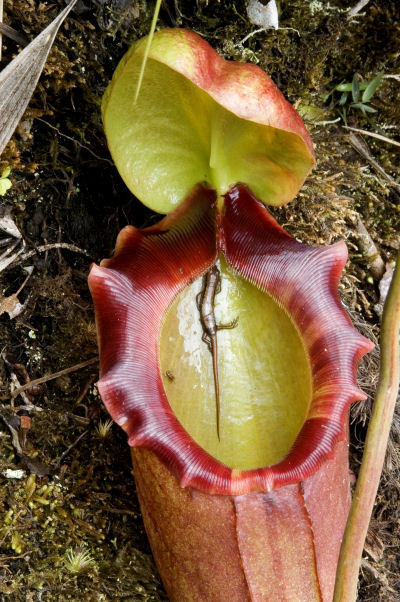
Drowned lizard found in a freshly opened pitcher. The animal was pulled out of the digestive zone for the photograph.

N. rajah is a carnivorous plant of the pitfall trap variety. It is famous for occasionally trapping vertebrates, even small mammals. There exist at least two records of drowned rats found in N. rajah pitchers. The first observation dates from 1862 and was made by Spenser St. John, who accompanied Hugh Low on two ascents of Mount Kinabalu. In 1988, Anthea Phillipps and Anthony Lamb confirmed the plausibility of this record when they managed to observe drowned rats in a large pitcher of N. rajah. In 2011, a drowned mountain treeshrew (Tupaia montana) in a N. rajah pitcher was reported. N. rajah occasionally traps other small vertebrates, including frogs, lizards and even birds, although these cases probably involve sick animals, or those seeking shelter or water in the pitcher, and certainly do not represent the norm. Insects, and particularly ants, comprise the majority of prey in both aerial and terrestrial pitchers.

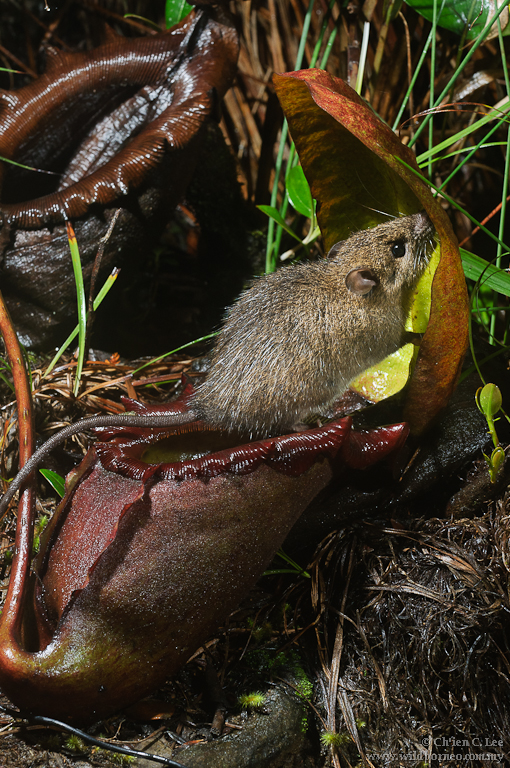
Rattus baluensis feeding on nectar from a pitcher of N. rajah

=== Mutualism with mammals ===
Nepenthes rajah has evolved a mutualistic relationship with mountain treeshrews (Tupaia montana) in order to collect their droppings. The inside of the reflexed lid exudes a sweet nectar. The distance from the pitcher mouth to the exudate is the same as the average body length of the mountain treeshrew. As it feeds, the treeshrew defecates, apparently as a method of marking its feeding territory. It is thought that in exchange for providing nectar, the faeces provide the plant with the majority of the nitrogen it requires. In N. lowii, N. macrophylla and N. rajah, the colour of the lower lid surface corresponds to visual sensitivity maxima of the mountain treeshrew in the green and blue wavebands, making the lid underside stand out against adjacent parts of the pitcher. Of the three species, N. rajah shows the tightest 'fit', particularly in the green waveband.

In 2011, it was reported that N. rajah has a similar mutualistic relationship with the summit rat (Rattus baluensis). Whereas the mountain treeshrew visits pitchers during daylight hours, the summit rat is primarily active at night; this may be an example of resource partitioning. Daily scat deposition rates were found to be similar for both mammalian species.

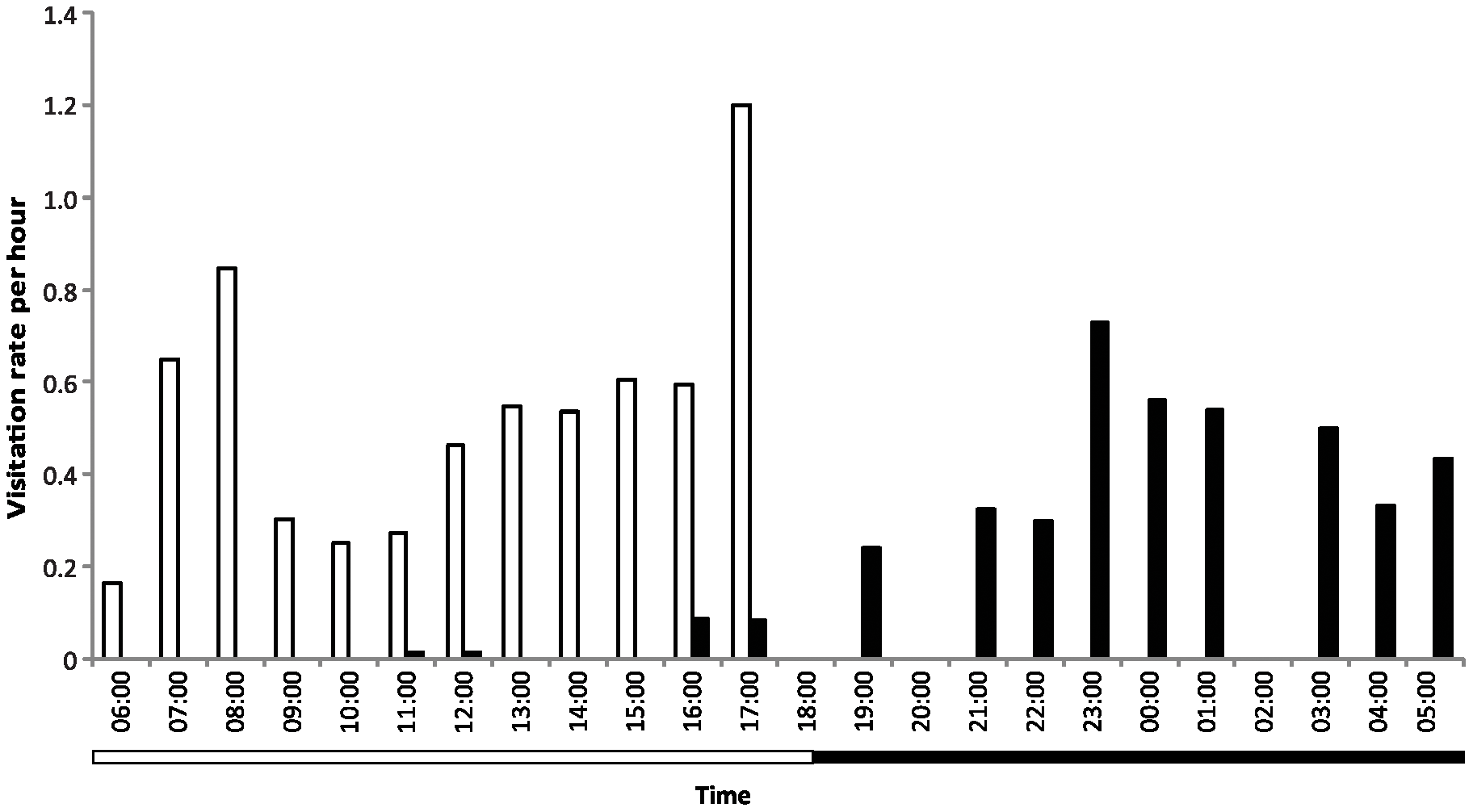
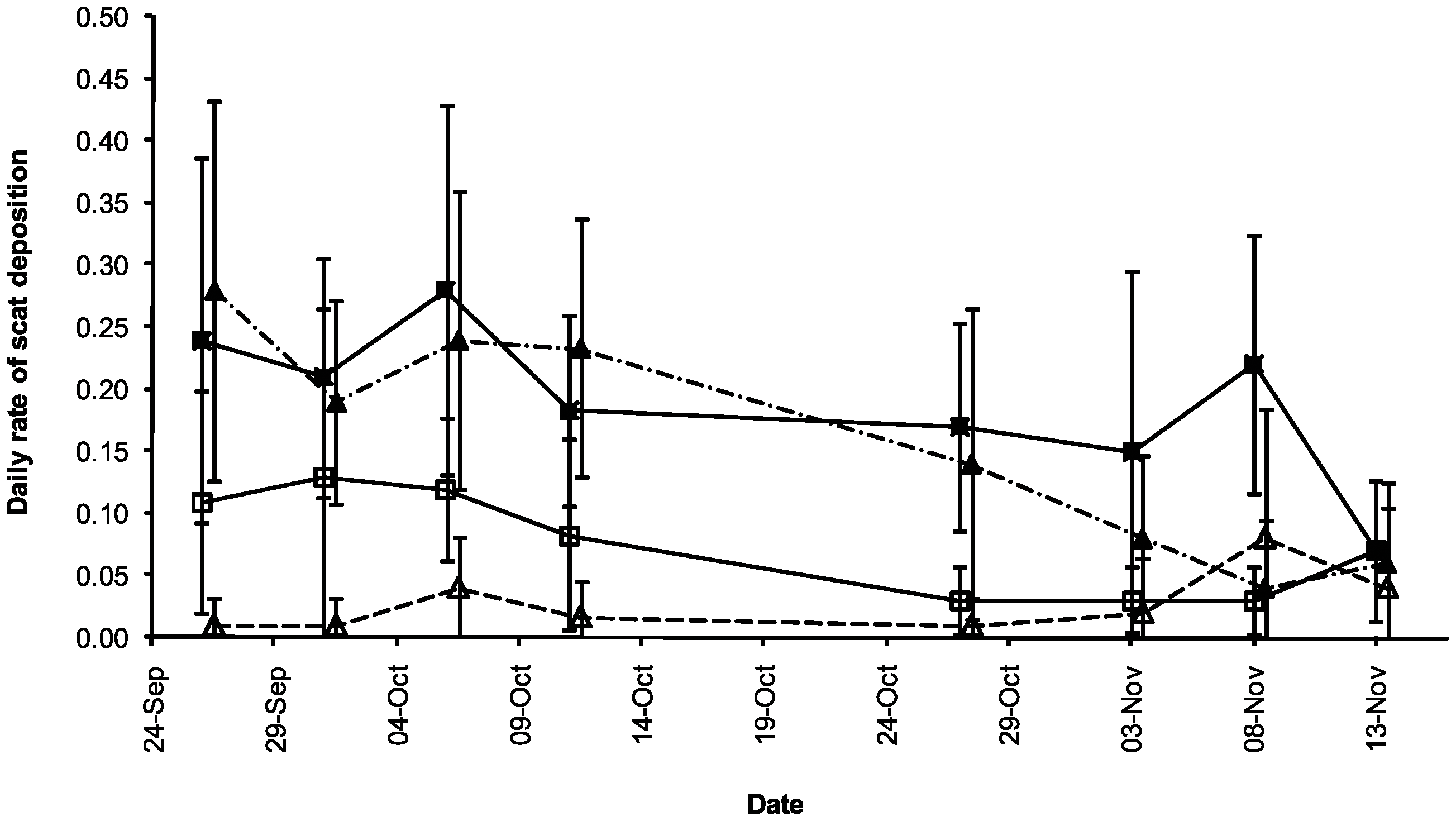
Left: Mammal visitation rates to N. rajah pitchers. White bars show visitation by T. montana and black bars by R. baluensis. The horizontal bar below the x-axis indicates photoperiod, white representing daylight hours and black nighttime.
Right: Scat deposition rates to N. rajah pitchers. Black squares show the mean number of T. montana droppings found within pitchers; white squares show the mean number found outside pitchers. Black and white diamonds show the same for R. baluensis.

== Other interactions with animals ==
=== Pitcher infauna ===
Culex rajah (left) and Toxorhynchites rajah (right)

Although Nepenthes are most famous for trapping and digesting animals, their pitchers play host to a large number of other organisms (known as infauna). These include fly and midge larvae, spiders (crab spiders such as Henriksenia labuanica), mites, ants, and even a species of crab, Geosesarma malayanum. The most common and conspicuous predators found in pitchers are mosquito larvae, which consume large numbers of other larvae during their development. Many of these animals are so specialised that they cannot survive anywhere else, and are referred to as nepenthebionts.

The complex relationships between these various organisms are not yet fully understood. The question of whether infaunal animals "steal" food from their hosts, or whether they are involved in a mutually beneficial (symbiotic) association has yet to be investigated experimentally and is the source of considerable debate. Clarke suggests that mutualism is a "likely situation", whereby "the infauna receives domicile, protection and food from the plant, while in return, the infauna helps to break down the prey, increase the rate of digestion and keep bacterial numbers low".

=== Species specific ===
As the size and shape of Nepenthes pitchers vary greatly between species, but little within a given taxon, it is not surprising that many infaunal organisms are specially adapted to life in only the traps of particular species. N. rajah is no exception, and in fact has two mosquito taxa named after it. Culex (Culiciomyia) rajah and Toxorhynchites (Toxorhynchites) rajah were described by Masuhisa Tsukamoto in 1989, based on larvae collected in pitchers of N. rajah on Mount Kinabalu three years earlier. The two species were found to live in association with larvae of Culex (Lophoceraomyia) jenseni, Uranotaenia (Pseudoficalbia) moultoni and an undescribed taxon, Tripteroides (Rachionotomyia) sp. No. 2. Concerning C. rajah, Tsukamoto noted that the "body surface of most larvae are covered in Vorticella-like protozoa".

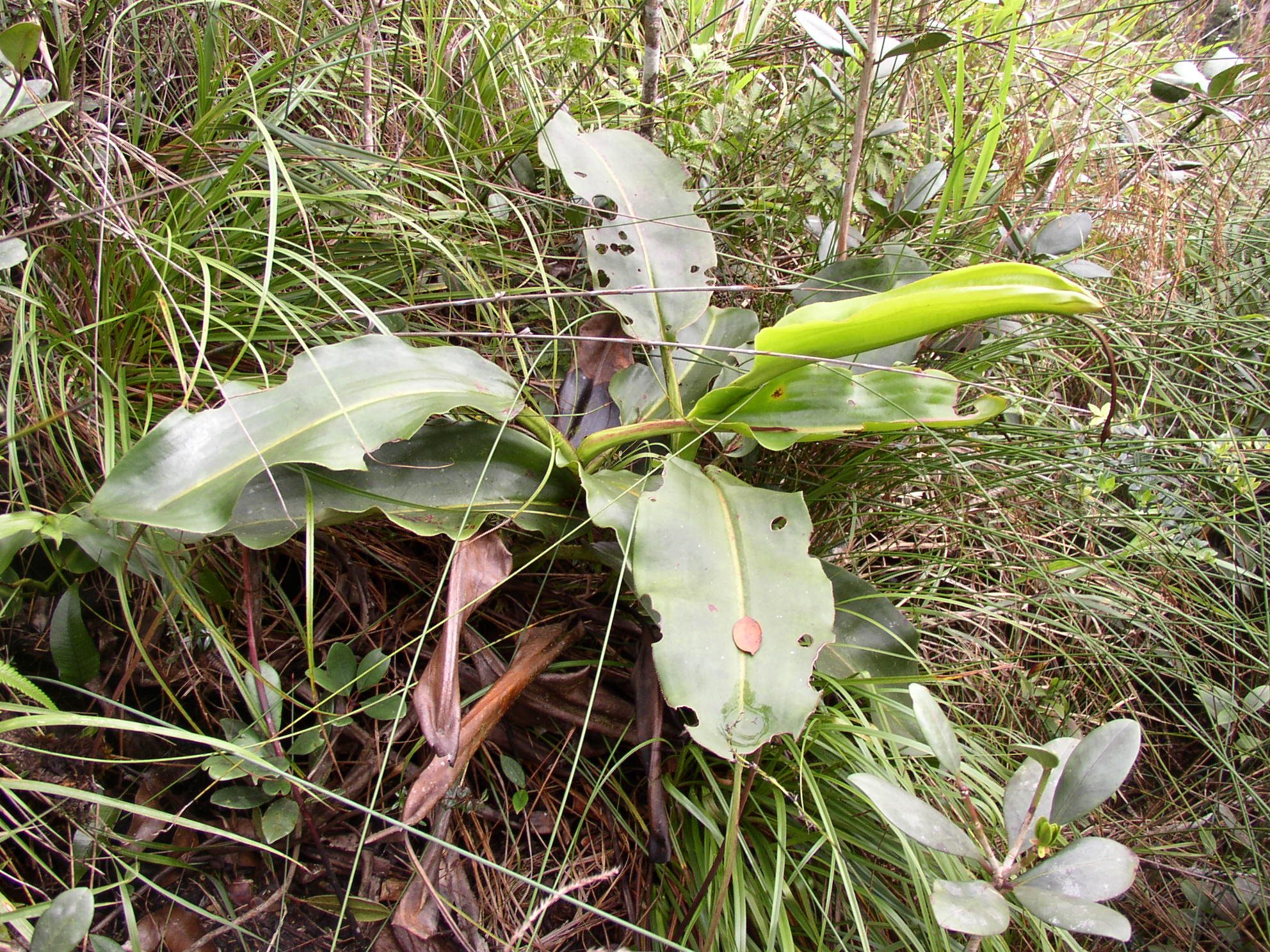
Damage caused by pests

Another species, Culex shebbearei, has been recorded as an infaunal organism of N. rajah. The original 1931 record by F. W. Edwards is based on a collection by H. M. Pendlebury in 1929 from a plant growing on Mount Kinabalu. However, Tsukamoto notes that in light of new information on these species, "it seems more likely to conclude that the species [C. rajah] is a new species which has been misidentitied as C. shebbearei for a long time, rather than to think that both C. shebbearei and C. rajah n. sp. are living in pitchers of Nepenthes rajah on Mt. Kinabalu".

=== Pests ===
Not all interactions between Nepenthes and fauna are beneficial to the plant. N. rajah is sometimes attacked by insects which feed on its leaves and damage substantial portions of the lamina. Monkeys and tarsiers occasionally rip pitchers open to feed on their contents.

== History and popularity ==
Due to its size, unusual morphology and striking coloration, N. rajah is a popular insectivorous plant. However, it remains a little-known species outside the field of carnivorous plants. Due to its specialised growing requirements, it is not a suitable houseplant and, as such, is only cultivated by hobbyists and professional growers. Its reputation for producing some of the most magnificent pitchers in the genus dates back to the late 19th century. N. rajah was first collected by Hugh Low on Mount Kinabalu in 1858. It was described the following year by Joseph Dalton Hooker, who named it after James Brooke, the first White Rajah of Sarawak. The description was published in The Transactions of the Linnean Society of London.

Spenser St. John wrote an account of his encounter with N. rajah on Mount Kinabalu in his 1862 Life in the Forests of the Far East. N. rajah was first collected for the Veitch Nurseries by Frederick William Burbidge in 1878, during his second trip to Borneo. Shortly after being introduced into cultivation in 1881, N. rajah proved very popular among wealthy Victorian horticulturalists and became a much sought-after species. A note in The Gardeners' Chronicle of 1881 mentions the Veitch plant as follows: "N. rajah at present is only a young Rajah, what it will become was lately illustrated in our columns...". A year later, young N. rajah plants were displayed at the Royal Horticultural Society's annual show for the first time. The specimen exhibited at the show by the Veitch Nurseries, the first of this species to be cultivated in Europe, won a first class certificate. In Veitch's catalogue for 1889, N. rajah was priced at £2.2s per plant.

Dwindling interest in Nepenthes at the turn of the century saw the demise of the Veitch Nurseries and consequently the loss of several species and hybrids in cultivation, including N. northiana and N. rajah. By 1905, the final N. rajah specimens from the Veitch nurseries were gone, as the cultural requirements of the plants proved too difficult to reproduce. The last surviving N. rajah in cultivation at this time was at the National Botanic Gardens at Glasnevin in Ireland, but this soon perished also.

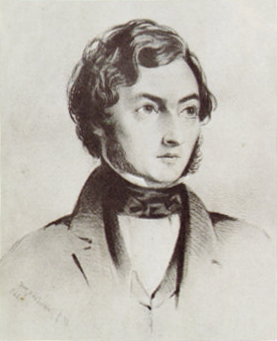
Hugh Low

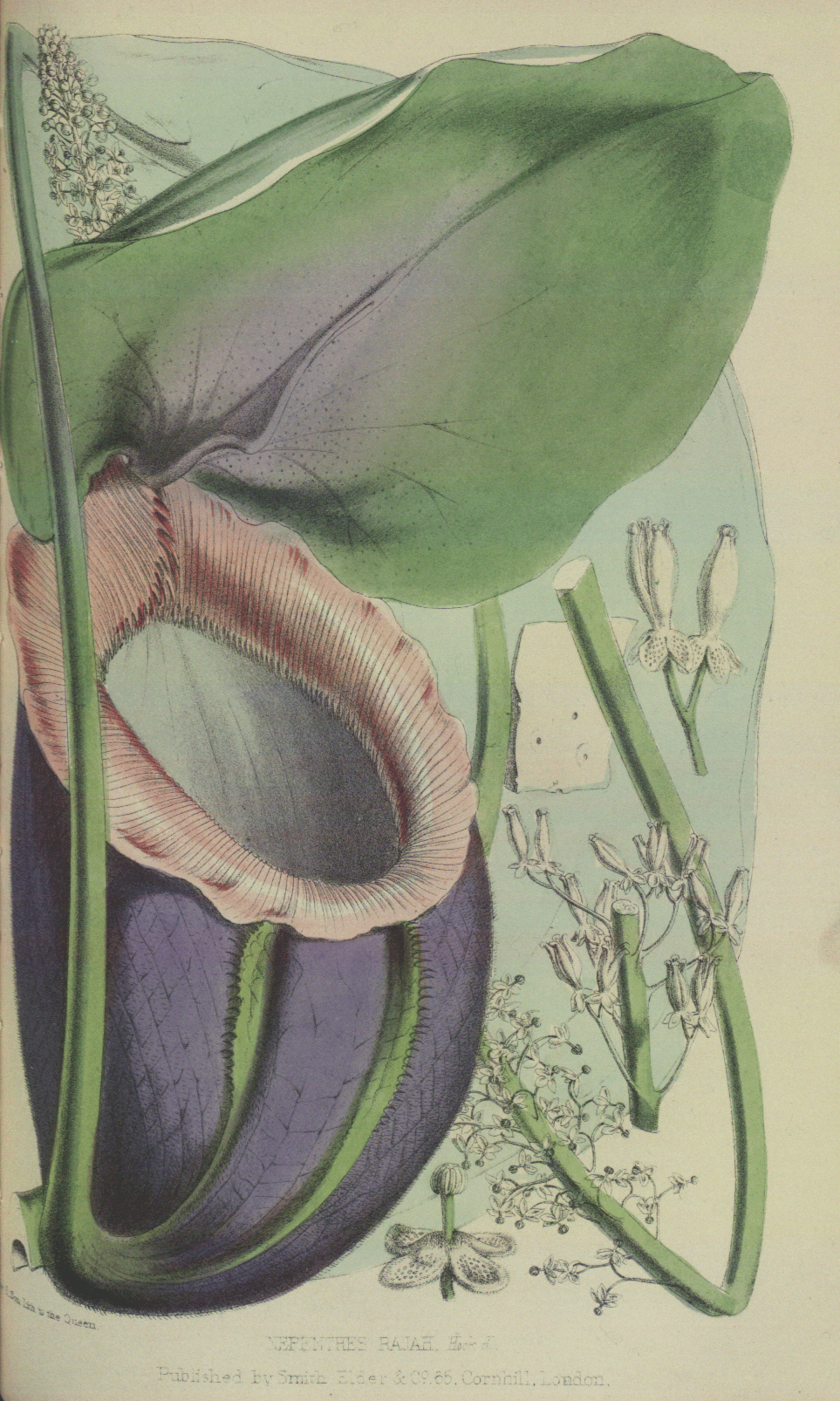
In Life in the Forests of the Far East in 1862

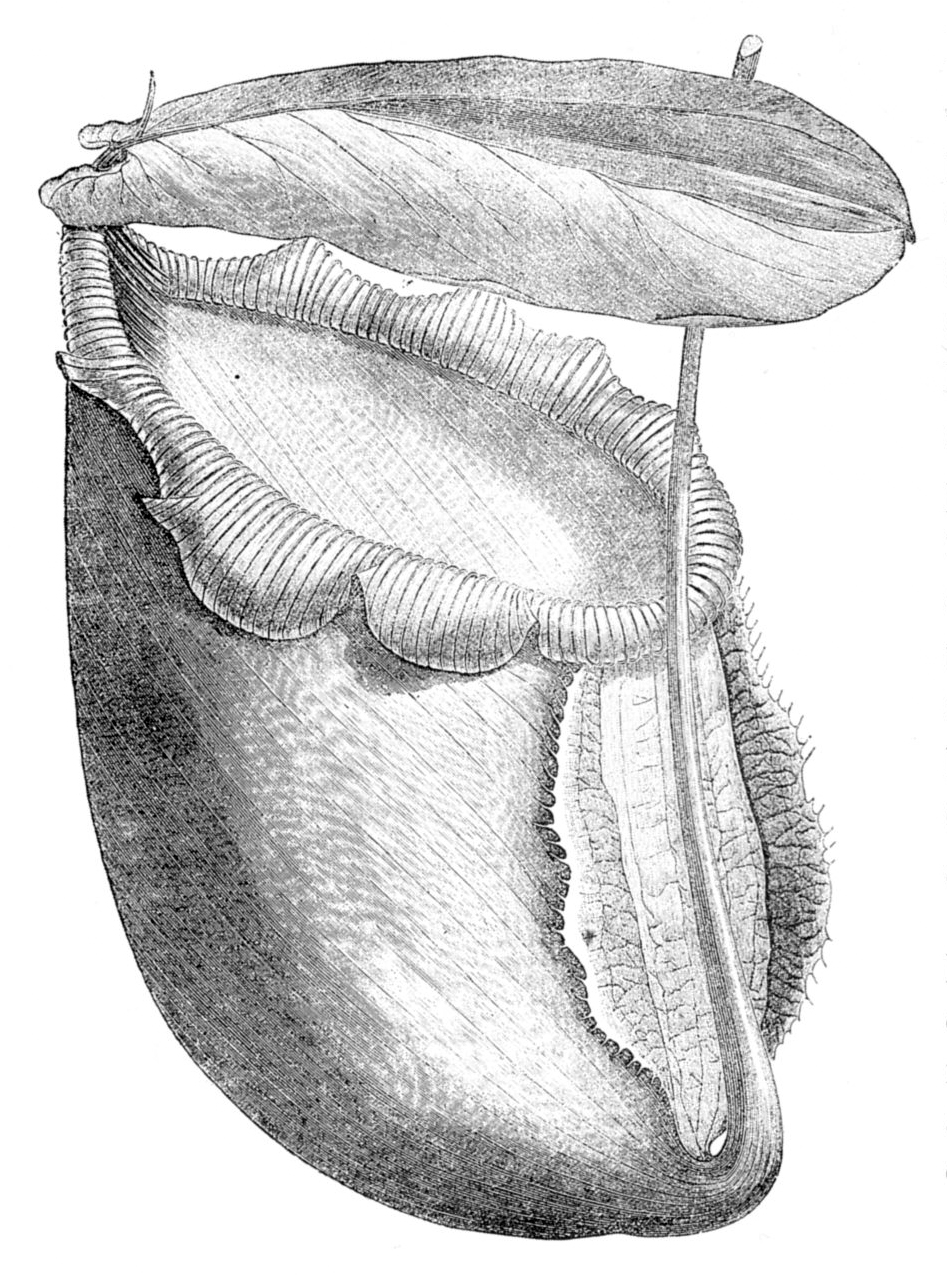
The first N. rajah plant cultivated in Europe, in The Garden, 1882
Click [show] to view a list of early publications, illustrations, and collections of Nepenthes rajah.

Early publications: Transact. Linn. Soc., XXII, p. 421 t. LXXII (1859); MIQ., Ill., p. 8 (1870); HOOK. F., in D.C., Prodr., XVII, p. 95 (1873); MAST., Gard. Chron., 1881, 2, p. 492 (1881); BURB., Gard. Chron., 1882, 1, p. 56 (1882); REG., Gartenfl., XXXII, p. 213, ic. p. 214 (1883); BECC., Mal., III, p. 3 & 8 (1886); WUNSCHM., in ENGL. & PRANTL, Nat. Pflanzenfam., III, 2, p. 260 (1891); STAPF, Transact. Linn. Soc., ser. 2, bot., IV, p. 217 (1894); BECK, Wien. Ill. Gartenz., 1895, p. 142, ic. 1 (1895); MOTT., Dict., III, p. 451 (1896); VEITCH, Journ. Roy. Hort. Soc., XXI, p. 234 (1897); BOERL., Handl., III, 1, p. 54 (1900); HEMSL., Bot. Mag., t. 8017 (1905); Gard. Chron., 1905, 2, p. 241 (1905); MACF., in ENGL., Das Pflanzenreich, IV, 111, p. 46 (1908); in BAIL., Cycl., IV, p. 2129, ic. 2462, 3 (1919); MERR., Bibl. Enum. Born., p. 284 (1921); DANS., Trop. Nat., XVI, p. 202, ic. 7 (1927).

Early illustrations: Transact. Linn. Soc., XXII, t. LXXII (1859) optima; Gard. Chron., 1881, 2, p. 493 (1881) bona, asc. 1; Gartenfl., 1883, p. 214 (1883) bona, asc. 1; Wien. Ill. Gartenfl., 1895, p. 143, ic. 1 (1895) asc. 1; Journ. Roy. Hort. Soc., XXI, p. 228 (1897) optima; Bot. Mag., t. 8017 (1905) optima; BAIL., Cycl., IV, ic. 2462, 3 (1919) asc. 1; Trop. Nat., XVI, p. 203 (1927) asc. 1.

Early collections: North Borneo. Mt. Kinabalu, IX 1913, Herbarium of the Sarawak Museum (material without flowers or fruits); Marai-parai Spur, 1-4 XII 1915, Clemens 11073, Herbarium Bogoriense, the Herbarium of the Buitenzorg Botanic Gardens (male and female material); 1650 m, 1892, Haviland 1812/1852, Herbarium of the Sarawak Museum (male and female material).

=== Recent popularity ===
N. rajah is relatively well known in Malaysia, especially its native Sabah. The species is used to promote Sabah's Kinabalu National Park and features on postcards from the region. N. rajah has appeared on the covers of Nepenthes publications, including Nepenthes of Mount Kinabalu (Kurata, 1976) and Nepenthes of Borneo (Clarke, 1997), both published in Kota Kinabalu. In 1996, Malaysia issued a series of four postage stamps including one of N. rajah. (Note: The stamp has been assigned a unique identification number in two popular stamp numbering systems: Scott #580 and Yvert #600.) N. rajah was featured in the first episode of Kingdom of Plants 3D, a natural history series presented by David Attenborough.

== Ecology ==
=== Kinabalu ===
N. rajah is restricted to Mount Kinabalu and neighbouring Mount Tambuyukon, both in Kinabalu National Park, Sabah, Malaysian Borneo. Mount Kinabalu is a massive granitic dome structure that is geologically young and formed from the intrusion and uplift of a granitic batholith. At 4,095.2 m (13,436 ft), it is by far the tallest mountain on the island of Borneo and one of the highest peaks in Southeast Asia.

N. rajah grows exclusively on serpentine soils with high concentrations of nickel and chromium, toxic to many plant species. This means that it faces less competition for space and nutrients.

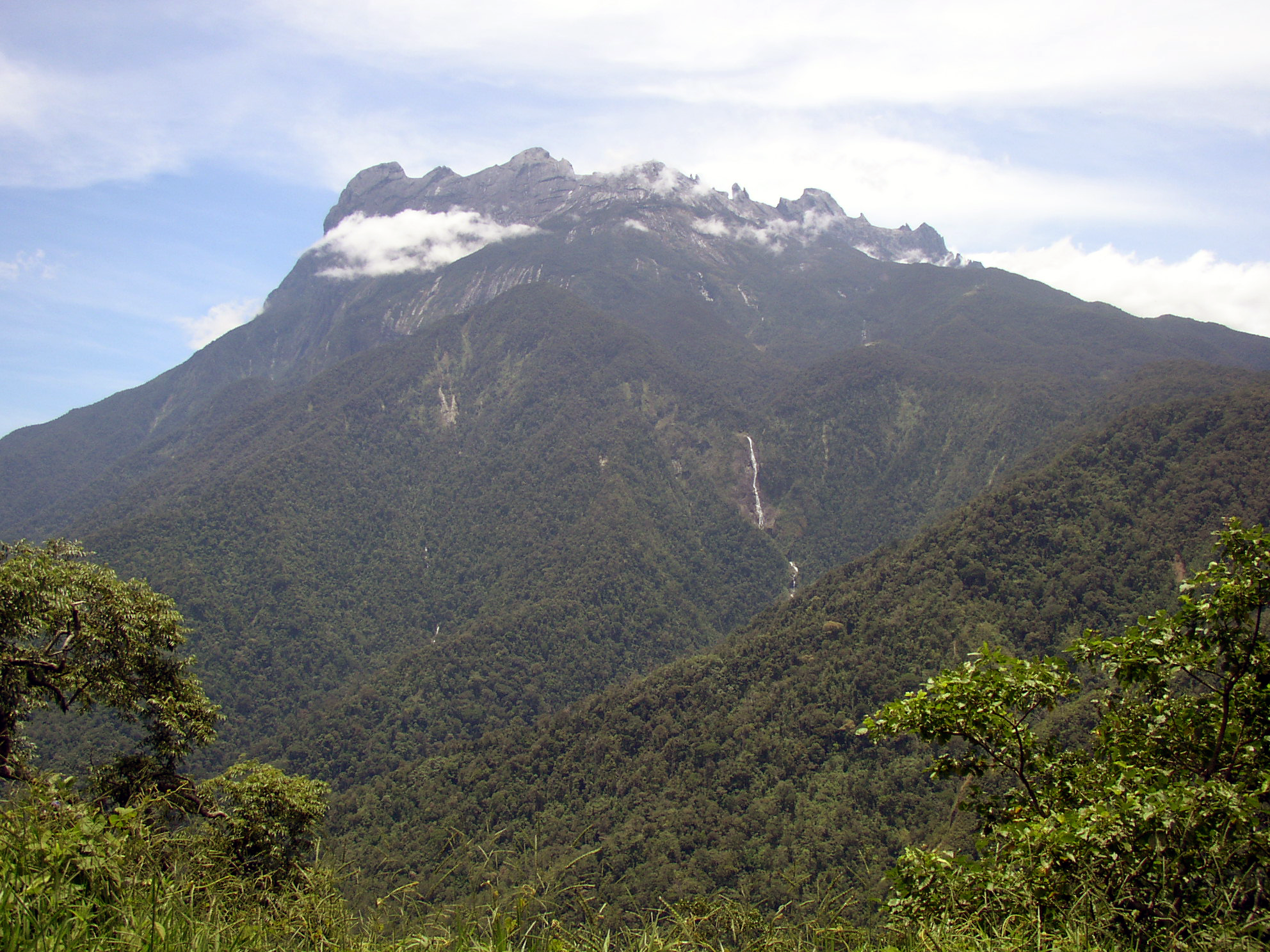
Mount Kinabalu, Borneo

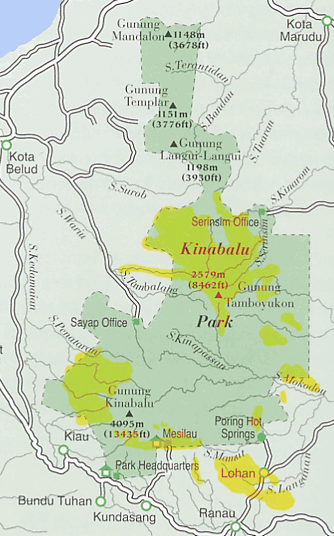
Ultramafic outcrops (yellow) in Kinabalu National Park (green)

=== Climate ===
N. rajah has an altitudinal distribution of 1,500–2,650 m (4,920–8,690 ft) above sea level and is thus considered an (ultra) highland or Upper Montane plant. In the upper limit of its range, night-time temperatures may approach freezing and day-time maxima rarely exceed 25 °C (77 °F). Due to the night-time temperature drop, relative air humidity increases significantly, rising from 65 to 75% to over 95%. Vegetation at this height is very stunted and slow-growing due to the extreme environmental conditions that prevail. Plants are often subjected to fierce winds and driving rain, as well as exposure to intense direct sunlight. The relatively open vegetation of the upper montane forest also experiences greater fluctuations in temperature and humidity compared with lower altitudes. These changes are largely governed by the extent of cloud cover. In the absence of clouds, temperatures rise rapidly, humidity drops, and light levels may be very high. When cloud cover returns, temperatures and light levels fall, while humidity levels increase.

== Conservation status ==
=== Endangered species ===
N. rajah is an Endangered (EN – B1+2e) on the IUCN Red List of Threatened Species. It is listed on Schedule I, Part II of the Wildlife Conservation Enactment (WCE) 1997 and CITES Appendix I, which prohibits commercial international trade in plants collected from the wild. Many plants have been removed from the wild illegally, depleting some populations within Kinabalu Park in the 1970s. This led to the CITES listing in 1981.

The recent advent of artificial tissue culture, or more specifically in vitro, technology in Europe and the United States has meant that plants can be produced in large numbers and sold at relatively low prices (~US$20–$30 in the case of N. rajah). In vitro propagation refers to production of whole plants from cell cultures derived from explants (generally seeds). This technology has largely removed the incentive for collectors to travel to Sabah to collect the plant illegally, and demand for wild-collected plants has fallen. The conservationist Rob Cantley assesses the current status of plants in the wild as due mainly to habitat damage rather than actual theft of plants. The plants in the wild are further threatened by climate phenomena including El Niño; the 1997/98 event and subsequent drought had a catastrophic effect on the Nepenthes on Mount Kinabalu.

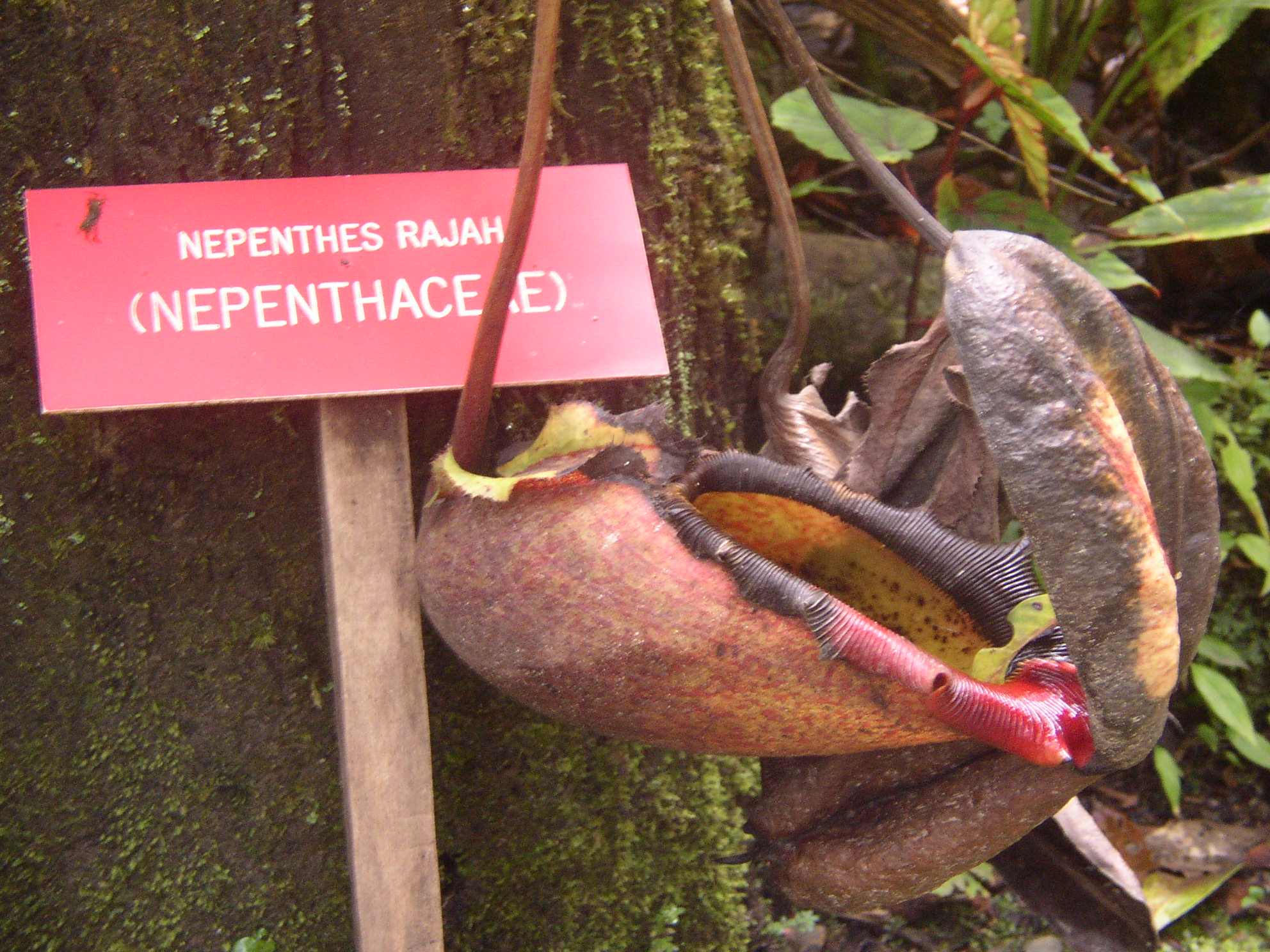
Plant on display at the Kinabalu "Mountain Garden"

=== Restricted distribution ===
The Mesilau Nature Resort near the village of Kundasang is now the only place where visitors can hope to see this species in its natural habitat. Daily guided tours are organised. Almost all other populations are in remote parts of Kinabalu National Park, off-limits to tourists.

Other localities include the Marai Parai plateau, Mesilau East River near Mesilau Cave, the Upper Kolopis River, and the eastern slope of Mount Tambuyukon. On Pig Hill, N. rajah grows at 1950–2320 m and is sympatric with N. burbidgeae, N. tentaculata, and the natural hybrid N. × alisaputrana.

== Natural hybrids ==
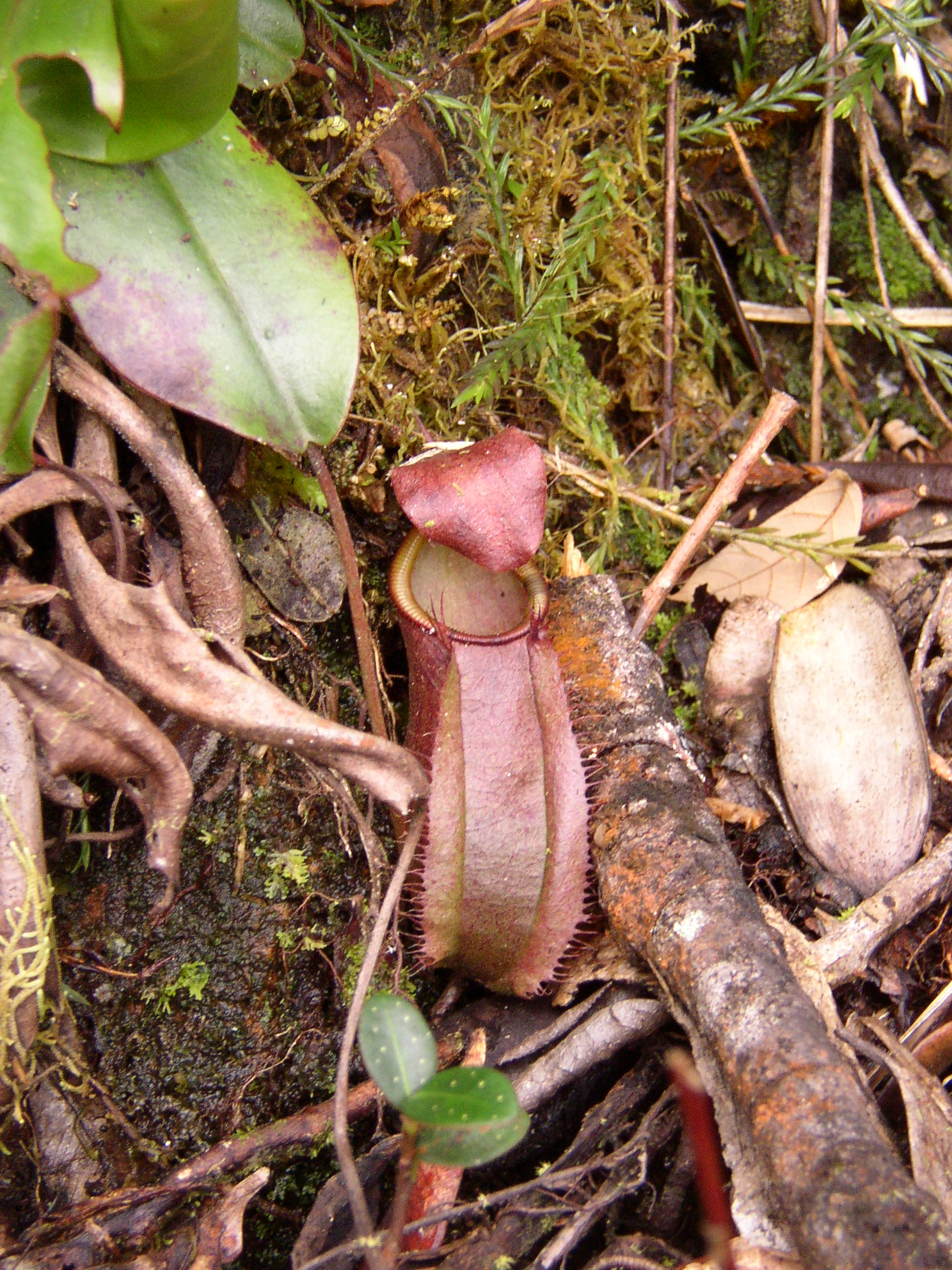
N. rajah × N. tentaculata, one of many naturally-occurring hybrids

N. rajah hybridises with all the other Nepenthes species with which it is sympatric. Charles Clarke notes that the pollen of N. rajah can be transported as much as 10 km (6.2 mi).

== Cultivation ==
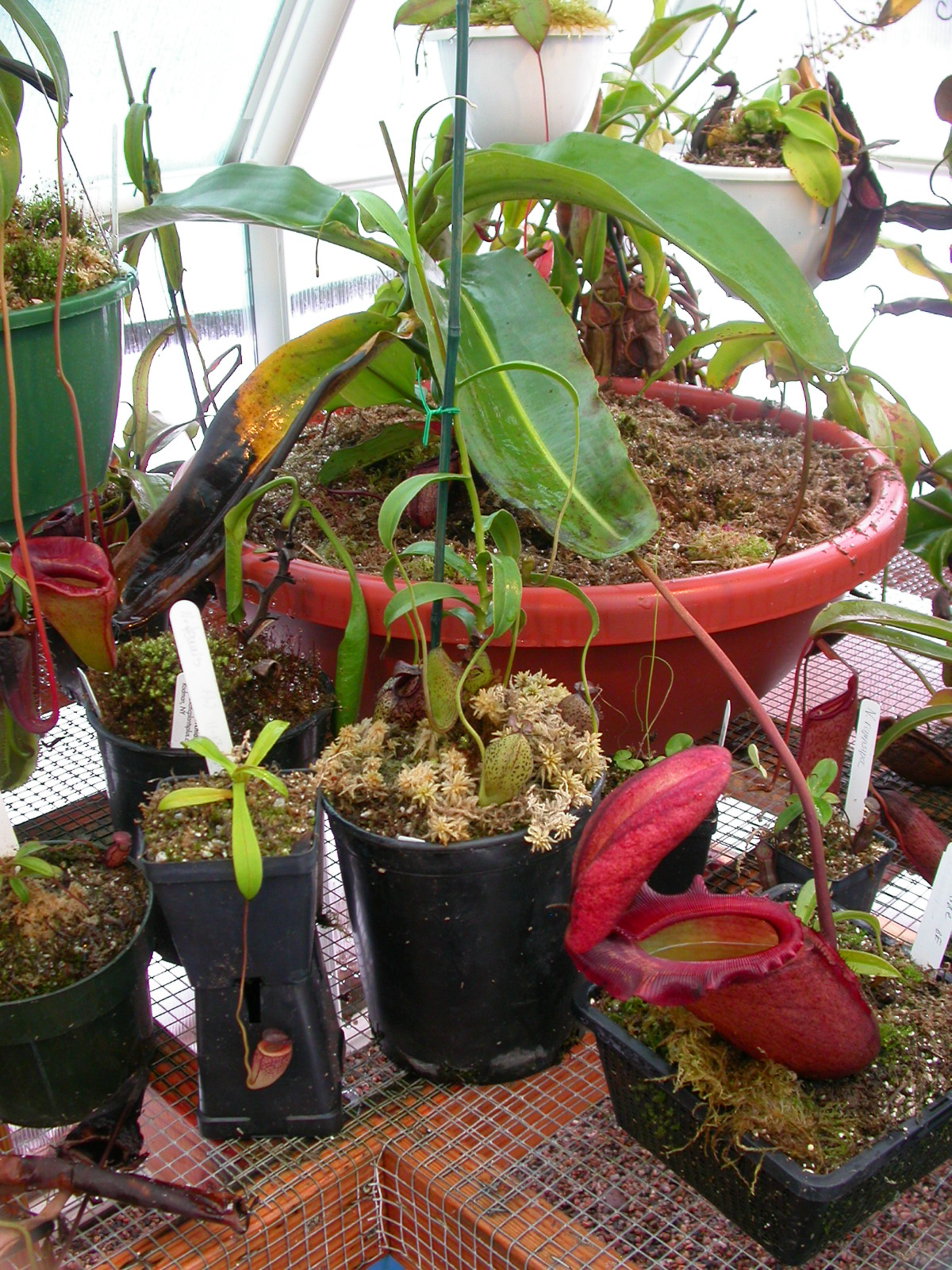
Cultivated N.rajah plant with large lower pitcher

N. rajah is a montane species or "highlander", growing at altitudes ranging from 1500 to 2650 m. As such, it requires warm days, with temperatures ranging (ideally) from approximately 25 to 30 °C, and cool nights, with temperatures of about 10 to 15 °C. It needs a fairly humid environment to grow well. Values in the region of 75% R.H. have been recommended. In its natural habitat, N. rajah grows in open areas, exposed to direct sunlight. In the tropics, growers can utilise natural sunlight as a source of illumination. In temperate zones, a photoperiod of 12 hours, comparable to that of the tropics, is recommended. The plant produces an extensive root system, requiring a wide pot. The species can tolerate hard water though purified water is recommended by specialists. From trials carried out by a commercial nursery,micronutrient solutions appear to be beneficial. Actual fertilizers (containing NPK) were found to be damaging.

== Common misconceptions ==
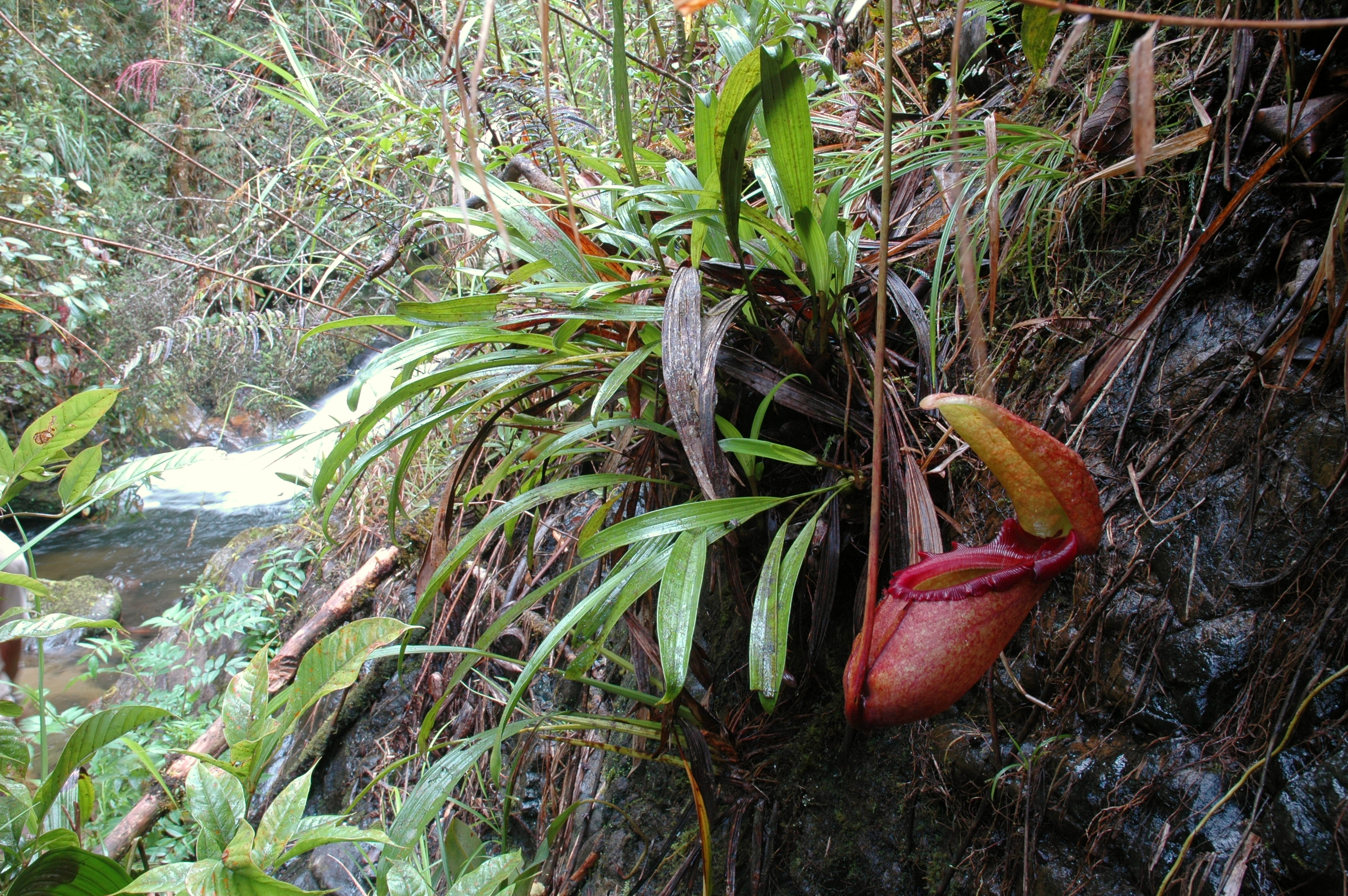
N. rajah growing near a small waterfall

Several stories have been told about the species. One such example is the famous legend that N. rajah grows exclusively in the spray zones of waterfalls, on ultramafic soils. Although it is true that they will grow in such places, N. rajah is certainly not found solely in the spray zones of waterfalls. It is likely that the misconception was popularised by Shigeo Kurata's 1976 book Nepenthes of Mount Kinabalu, in which he states that "N. rajah is rather fond of wet places like swamps or the surroundings of a waterfall". Some N. rajah plants do indeed grow near waterfalls (as noted by Hugo Steiner, 2002) "providing quite a humid microclimate". Another myth is that it occasionally catches small monkeys and other large animals in its pitchers. Such tales can probably be explained as rodents being mistaken for other species.

== Sources ==
- [Anonymous] 1881. Messrs. Veitch's Nepenthes-house. The Gardeners' Chronicle, new series, 16(410): 598–599.
- [Anonymous] 1883. Mr. A. E. Ratcliff's Nepenthes. The Gardeners' Chronicle 20(497): 18–19.
- [Anonymous] 1884. Nepenthes Rajah. The Gardeners' Chronicle, new series, 21(524): 52.
- [Anonymous] 1884. Nepenthes Rajah. The Gardeners' Chronicle, new series, 21(526): 116.
- [Anonymous] 1887. Nepenthes at Messrs. Veitch's, Chelsea. The Gardeners' Chronicle, series 3, 2(41): 438.
- "Pflanze verdaut Maus". Spiegel Online. September 29, 2006.
- "T. B." 1881. Home correspondence. Nepenthes Rajah. The Gardeners' Chronicle, new series, 16(409): 571.
- Adam, J. H. & C. C. Wilcock 1992. A new natural hybrid of Nepenthes from Mt. Kinabalu (Sabah). Reinwardtia 11: 35–40.
- Adam, J. H. 1997. "Prey spectra of Bornean Nepenthes species (Nepenthaceae) in relation to their habitat" (PDF). Pertanika Journal of Tropical Agricultural Science 20(2–3): 121–134.
- Adam, J. H. & C. C. Wilcock 1998 ['1996']. Pitcher plants of Mt. Kinabalu in Sabah. The Sarawak Museum Journal 50(71): 145–171.
- Adlassnig, W., M. Peroutka, H. Lambers & I. K. Lichtscheidl 2005. The roots of carnivorous plants. Root Physiology: from Gene to Function 4: 127–140. ISBN 978-1-4020-4098-6 (print) ISBN 978-1-4020-4099-3 (online) doi:10.1007/1-4020-4099-7_6
- Arx, B., J. Schlauer & M. Groves 2001. CITES Carnivorous Plant Checklist. The Trustees of the Royal Botanic Gardens Kew. 99 pp. ISBN 1-84246-035-8
- Beaman, J.H. & C. Anderson 2004. The Plants of Mount Kinabalu: 5. Dicotyledon Families Magnoliaceae to Winteraceae. Natural History Publications (Borneo), Kota Kinabalu.
- Beaver, R. A. 1979. Fauna and food webs of pitcher plants in West Malaysia. The Malayan Nature Journal 33 (1): 1–10.
- Beck, G. 1895. Die Gattung Nepenthes. Wiener Illustrierte Gartenzeitung.
- Burbidge, F. W. 1880. The Gardens of the Sun. Murray, London. 364 pp.
- Burbidge, F.W. 1882. Notes on the new Nepenthes. The Gardeners' Chronicle, new series, 17(420): 56.
- Camilleri, T. 1998. Carnivorous Plants. Kangaroo Press, Roseville, New South Wales, Australia.
- Chan, S. 2005. Pitcher plant paradise. The Star, August 27, 2005.
- Cheers, G. 1992. Letts Guide to Carnivorous Plants of the World. Letts of London House, Parkgate Road, London SW11 4NQ. x + 174 pp. ISBN 1-85238-124-8
- Clarke, C. M. 2001b. A Guide to the Pitcher Plants of Sabah. Natural History Publications (Borneo), Kota Kinabalu. iv + 40 pp. ISBN 983-812-015-4
- Clarke, C. 2013. What Can Tree Shrews Tell Us about the Effects of Climate Change on Pitcher Plants? Archived 2016-03-05 at the Wayback Machine [video] TESS seminars, 25 September 2013.
- Clarke, C. M. & R. Kruger 2005. Nepenthes rowanae (Nepenthaceae), a remarkable species from Cape York, Australia. Carnivorous Plant Newsletter 34 (2): 36–41.
- Clarke, C.; Cantley, R.; Nerz, J.; Rischer, H.; Witsuba, A. (2000). "Nepenthes rajah". IUCN Red List of Threatened Species. 2000 e.T39690A10251581.
- Corner, E.J.H. 1996. Pitcher-plants (Nepenthes). In: K.M. Wong & A. Phillipps (eds.) Kinabalu: Summit of Borneo. A Revised and Expanded Edition. The Sabah Society, Kota Kinabalu. pp. 115–121. ISBN 9679994740.
- D'Amato, P. 1998. The Savage Garden: Cultivating Carnivorous Plants. Ten Speed Press, Berkeley, California. xxii + 314 pp. ISBN 0-89815-915-6
- Danser, B. H. 1928. 38. Nepenthes Rajah. In: The Nepenthaceae of the Netherlands Indies. Bulletin de Jardin de Botanique, Buitenzorg, Série III, 9 (3–4): 249–438.
- Douglas, J. 1884. Home correspondence. Nepenthes Rajah. The Gardeners' Chronicle, new series, 21(527): 151.
- Edwards, F. W. 1931. Mosquitoes breeding in plant pitchers. Natural History Magazine 3: 25–28.
- Ellis, R. 2000. Carnivores on Stamps and Currency. Carnivorous Plant Newsletter 29 (3): 90–92.
- Fairbrothers, D. E., J. J. Mabry, R. L. Scogin & B. L. Turner 1975. Annals of the Missouri Botanical Garden 62: 765–800.
- Fretwell, S. 2013. Back in Borneo for giant Nepenthes. Part 1: Mesilau Nature Reserve, Ranau. Victorian Carnivorous Plant Society Journal 107: 6–13.
- Gibson, T. C. 1983. "On the Cultivation of the Giant Malaysian Pitcherplant (Nepenthes rajah)" (PDF).Carnivorous Plant Newsletter 12 (4): 82–84.
- Gibson, T. C. 1988. "A Further Note on Nepenthes rajah Cultivation" (PDF).Carnivorous Plant Newsletter 17 (3): 84.
- Hemsley, W. B. 1905. Nepenthes Rajah. Curtis's Botanical Magazine, CXXXI (4th series, I) t. 8017.
- Hooker, J. D. 1859. XXXV. On the origin and development of the pitchers of Nepenthes, with an account of some new Bornean plants of that genus. The Transactions of the Linnean Society of London 22(4): 415–424. doi:10.1111/j.1096-3642.1856.tb00113.x
- Jay, M. & P. Lebreton 1972. Chemotaxonomic research on vascular plants. The flavonoids of Sarraceniaceae, Nepenthaceae, Droseraceae and Cephlotaceae, a critical study of the order Sarraceniales. Naturaliste Canadien 99: 607–613.
- Jebb, M. H. P. & M. R. Cheek 1997. A skeletal revision of Nepenthes (Nepenthaceae). Blumea 42 (1): 1–106.
- Johnson, N. 2013. The history of the genus Nepenthes at Kew. Planta Carnivora 35(1): 6–19.
- Kaul, R. B. 1982. Floral and Fruit Morphology of Nepenthes lowii and N. villosa, Montane Carnivores of Borneo. American Journal of Botany 69 (5): 793–803.
- Kurata, S. 1976. Nepenthes of Mount Kinabalu. Sabah National Parks Publications No. 2, Sabah National Parks Trustees, Kota Kinabalu. 80 pp.
- Kurata, S. 1984. Journal of the Insectivorous Plant Society (Japan) 35: 65.
- Malouf, P. 1995. "A visit to Kinabalu Park" (PDF). Carnivorous Plant Newsletter 24(3): 64–69.
- Macfarlane, J. M. 1908. Nepenthaceae. A. Engler, Das Pflanzenreich IV, 111, Heft. 36: 1–91.
- Macfarlane, J.M. 1911. New species of Nepenthes. Contributions from the Botanical Laboratory of the University of Pennsylvania 3(3): 207–210. (plates I–II)
- Macfarlane, J.M. 1914. Nepenthes sp.. Biological Journal of the Linnean Society, XLII.
- Masters, M.T. 1881. New garden plants. Nepenthes Rajah, Hook. f.. The Gardeners' Chronicle, new series, 16(407): 492–493.
- McPherson, S.R. & A. Robinson 2012. Field Guide to the Pitcher Plants of Borneo. Redfern Natural History Productions, Poole.
- (in German) Meimberg, H. 2002. "Molekular-systematische Untersuchungen an den Familien Nepenthaceae und Ancistrocladaceae sowie verwandter Taxa aus der Unterklasse Caryophyllidae s. l." (PDF). Ph.D. thesis, Ludwig-Maximilians-Universität München, Munich.
- Meimberg, H. & G. Heubl 2006. Introduction of a nuclear marker for phylogenetic analysis of Nepenthaceae. Plant Biology 8(6): 831–840. doi:10.1055/s-2006-924676
- Mey, F.S. 2014. Joined lecture on carnivorous plants of Borneo with Stewart McPherson. Strange Fruits: A Garden's Chronicle, February 21, 2014.
- Moran, J. A. 1991. The role and mechanism of Nepenthes rafflesiana pitchers as insect traps in Brunei. Ph.D. thesis, University of Aberdeen, Aberdeen, Scotland.
- Nelson, E. C. The waxing of glorious rajah. Kew magazine [May 1991] 8 (2): 81–89.
- Nerz, J. & A. Wistuba 2007. Nepenthes mantalingajanensis (Nepenthaceae), eine bemerkenswerte neue Spezies aus Palawan (Philippinen). Das Taublatt 55(3): 17–25.
- (in Japanese) Oikawa, T. 1992. Nepenthes Rajah Hook.f.. In: Muyū kusa – Nepenthes (無憂草 – Nepenthes). [The Grief Vanishing.] Parco Co., Japan. pp. 8–9.
- Phillipps, A. 1988. "A Second Record of Rats as Prey in Nepenthes rajah" (PDF). Carnivorous Plant Newsletter 17 (2): 55.
- Phillipps, A. & A. Lamb 1996. Pitcher Plants of Borneo. Natural History Publications (Borneo), Kota Kinabalu. x + 171 pp. ISBN 983-812-009-X
- Reginald 1883. Nepenthes Rajah J. D. Hooker. Gartenflora, XXXII, p. 213.
- Saint-John, S. 1862. Life in the Forests of the Far East; or, Travels in northern Borneo. 2 volumes. London: Smith, Elder & Co. (reprinted by Oxford University Press, 1974)
- Simpson, R. 1991. Plants in peril, 15: Nepenthes rajah. Kew magazine [May 1991] 8 (2): 89–94.
- Slack, A. 1979. Nepenthes rajah. In: Carnivorous Plants. Ebury Press, London. p. 85.
- Slack, A. 1986. Insect-Eating Plants and How to Grow Them. Alphabooks, Dorset, UK. 172 pp. ISBN 0-906670-42-X (hardback) ISBN 0-906670-35-7 (paperback)
- Som, R. M. 1988. Systematic studies on Nepenthes species and hybrids in the Malay Peninsula. Ph.D. thesis, Fakulti Sains Hayat, Universiti Kebangsaan Malaysia, UKM Bangi, Selangor Darul Ehsan.
- Stace, C.A. 1980. Plant Taxonomy and Biosystematics. Arnold, London. ISBN 0-521-42785-1
- Steiner, H. 2002. Borneo: Its Mountains and Lowlands with their Pitcher Plants. Toihaan Publishing Company, Kota Kinabalu. viii + 136 pp. ISBN 983-40421-1-6
- Thorogood, C. 2010. The Malaysian Nepenthes: Evolutionary and Taxonomic Perspectives. Nova Science Publishers, New York.
- Tsukamoto, M. 1989. "Two New Mosquito Species from a Pitcher Plant of Mt. Kinabalu, Sabah, Malaysia: Culex rajah and Toxorhynchites rajah (Diptera: Culicidae)" (PDF). Archived from the original (PDF) on 2011-07-23.. Japanese Journal of Tropical Medicine and Hygiene, 17 (3): 215–228.
- Yeo, J. 1996. A trip to Kinabalu Park. Bulletin of the Australian Carnivorous Plant Society, Inc. 15(4): 4–5.
