= Rajah (disambiguation) =

Rajah or Raja is a monarch or princely ruler in South and Southeast Asia.

Rajah may also refer to:

- Rajah (comics), a fictional character in the Marvel Universe
- Rajah, an orange-striped tiger from Disney's Aladdin

== People ==
- A. M. Rajah (1929–1989), playback singer
- Indranee Rajah (born 1963), Deputy Speaker of Singapore's Parliament
- Rajah Humabon, Muslim king of the Philippines, during the 16th century
- Rajah Lakandula, Muslim king of the Philippines, during the 16th century
- Rajah Muthiah Chettiar, Tamil banker, educationist, philanthropist, and politician
- Ra'Jah O'Hara, American drag queen
- Rajah Sulayman (1558–1575), Muslim king of the Philippines, during the 16th century
- Rogers Hornsby (1896–1963), professional baseball player for the St. Louis Cardinals. He was nicknamed "The Rajah"
- Rajah Caruth (born 2002), American NASCAR driver

== Organisms ==
- Rajah butterflies, certain brush-footed butterflies in the genus Charaxes
- Culex rajah, a culicine mosquito species
- Nepenthes rajah, a pitcher plant species
- Rajah Brooke's birdwing, the swallowtail butterfly species Trogonoptera brookiana
- Rajah (dog), famed New Zealand German Shepherd police dog
- Rajah scops owl, the owl species Otus brookii
- Rajah spiny rat, the rodent species Maxomys rajah
- Toxorhynchites rajah, a toxorhynchitine mosquito species

== Places ==
- Ayer Rajah, an area located in the Queenstown Planning Area in the south-west part of Singapore
- Rajah Buayan, a municipality in the Philippines

== Things ==
- Ayer Rajah Expressway, a Singapore expressway
- HMS Rajah (D10), an escort aircraft carrier
- Rajah Broadcasting Network, a Philippine media network
- Rajah Motors, former automobile manufacturer in India
- Rajah Quilt, a 1841 quilt made by convicts aboard the Rajah
- Rajah Sulaiman Movement, a terrorist organization
- The Rajah (play), an 1883 play
- The Rajah (1911 film), a silent short film
- The Rajah (1919 film), a film starring Harold Lloyd
- The Rajah (album), a 1985 album by Lee Morgan

== See also ==
- Raja (disambiguation)
- Rajput
- Raj (disambiguation)
- Raju (disambiguation)
- Maharaj
- Rana (disambiguation)
- Rai (surname)
- Rajiv
