= Japanese Journal =

Japanese Journal may refer to:

- Japanese Journal of Applied Physics
- Japanese Journal of Religious Studies
- Japanese Journal of Tropical Medicine and Hygiene

== See also ==
- Tokyo Journal, formerly published internationally as Japan Journal
