= Ilex mesilauensis =

Conservation status
- Data Deficient (IUCN 3.1)

Scientific classification
- Kingdom: Plantae
- Clade: Tracheophytes
- Clade: Angiosperms
- Clade: Eudicots
- Clade: Asterids
- Order: Aquifoliales
- Family: Aquifoliaceae
- Genus: Ilex
- Species: I. mesilauensis

Binomial name
- Ilex mesilauensis S.Andrews

Species of tree in the holly family

Ilex mesilauensis is a tree in the family Aquifoliaceae, native to Borneo. It is named for the Mesilau area of Sabah.

== Description ==
Ilex mesilauensis grows up to 15 metres (50 ft) tall. The bark is fissured, with big lenticels. The leathery leaves are obovate or spatulate and measure up to 7.5 cm (3 in) long. The inflorescences are in spikes.

== Distribution and habitat ==
Ilex mesilauensis is endemic to Borneo, where it is known only from a single location on the Mesilau River near Mount Kinabalu in Sabah. Its known habitat is in lower montane forests, at elevations of around 1,500 m (5,000 ft).
