= Mesilau =

Protected area in Malaysia

Coordinates: 5°59′N 116°36′E

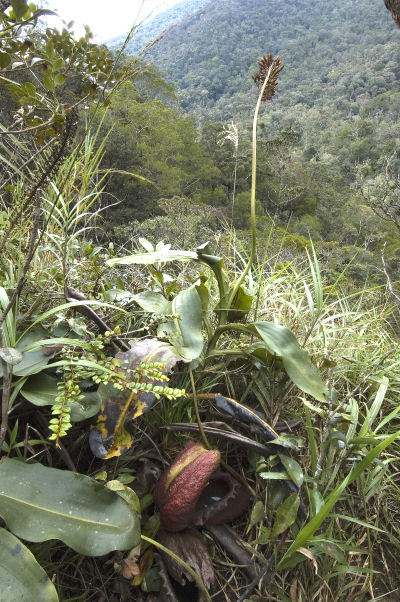
Nepenthes rajah growing along the Mesilou nature trail

Mesilou, named after Mesilou River, is an area situated at approximately 2,000 m (6,562 ft) above sea level on the East Ridge of Mount Kinabalu in Kinabalu National Park, Sabah, Malaysian Borneo. It is the site of the Mesilou Nature Resort, which is owned and operated by Sutera Sanctuary Lodges.

Mesilou East River and Mesilou West River pass through the Mesilou area. Mesilou East River forms a deep ravine, and Mesilou Cave is located nearby.

One of the two main summit routes of Mount Kinabalu starts at the Mesilou Nature Resort and is called the Mesilou Trail. The Mesilou Trail meets the old Kinabalu Summit Trail just above Layang-Layang (Dusun for Place of Swallows), which is situated at approximately 2,700 m (8,858 ft).

== Flora ==
Mesilou is home to the only population of Nepenthes rajah pitcher plants accessible to regular visitors. The plants grow on a steep hillside overlooking Mesilau East River. A number of other Nepenthes species, including N. burbidgeae, N. fusca, and N. macrovulgaris, have been transplanted there from the area around the Mesilou Nature Resort on Pinausok Plateau. A single example of the rare natural hybrid N. lowii × N. rajah also grows nearby. Daily guided tours are organised to the "Nepenthes Garden" where these plants are found. This nature trail is subject to a fee and operates daily from 9 am to 4 pm. The tree species Ilex mesilauensis is named for the area and is only found here.

== Climate ==
Mesilou has a subtropical highland climate (Cfb) with heavy rainfall year-round.

Climate data for Mesilou
Month	Jan	Feb	Mar	Apr	May	Jun	Jul	Aug	Sep	Oct	Nov	Dec	Year
Mean daily maximum °C (°F)	20.8 (69.4)	20.8 (69.4)	20.9 (69.6)	20.9 (69.6)	20.7 (69.3)	20.1 (68.2)	19.7 (67.5)	19.9 (67.8)	19.9 (67.8)	20.2 (68.4)	20.8 (69.4)	21.3 (70.3)	20.5 (68.9)
Daily mean °C (°F)	17.0 (62.6)	16.9 (62.4)	16.9 (62.4)	16.9 (62.4)	16.9 (62.4)	16.5 (61.7)	16.1 (61.0)	16.2 (61.2)	16.1 (61.0)	16.6 (61.9)	17.1 (62.8)	17.5 (63.5)	16.7 (62.1)
Mean daily minimum °C (°F)	13.2 (55.8)	13.0 (55.4)	12.9 (55.2)	13.0 (55.4)	13.2 (55.8)	12.9 (55.2)	12.6 (54.7)	12.6 (54.7)	12.4 (54.3)	13.0 (55.4)	13.4 (56.1)	13.7 (56.7)	13.0 (55.4)
Average rainfall mm (inches)	150 (5.9)	110 (4.3)	119 (4.7)	146 (5.7)	235 (9.3)	191 (7.5)	167 (6.6)	183 (7.2)	204 (8.0)	186 (7.3)	214 (8.4)	192 (7.6)	2,097 (82.5)
Source: Climate-Data.org
