= Culex jenseni =

Scientific classification
- Kingdom: Animalia
- Phylum: Arthropoda
- Class: Insecta
- Order: Diptera
- Family: Culicidae
- Genus: Culex
- Species: C. jenseni

Binomial name
- Culex jenseni (De Meijere, 1910)

Species of mosquito

Culex jenseni is a species of mosquito in the genus Culex. It is endemic to Sabah, Malaysian Borneo. C. jenseni is placed in the subgenus Lophoceraomyia. In its larval stage, C. jenseni develops in the pitchers of Nepenthes species, especially N. rajah. As such, it is considered a nepenthebiont.
