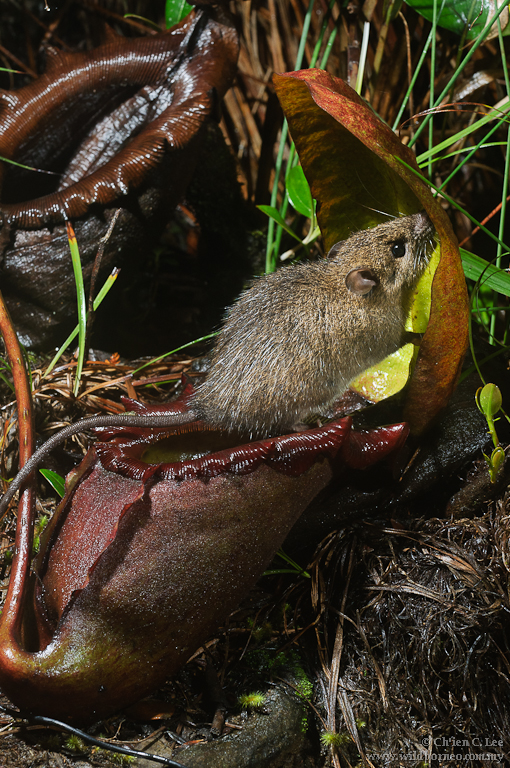
- on a pitcher of Nepenthes rajah

Conservation status
- Least Concern (IUCN 3.1)

Scientific classification
- Kingdom: Animalia
- Phylum: Chordata
- Class: Mammalia
- Order: Rodentia
- Family: Muridae
- Genus: Rattus
- Species: R. baluensis

Binomial name
- Rattus baluensis (Thomas, 1894)

= Summit rat =

Species of rodent

The summit rat (Rattus baluensis) is a species of rodent in the family Muridae. It is found only on Mount Kinabalu and Mount Tambuyukon, Malaysia, and has been recorded at altitudes of 2,040 to 2,477 m on Mt. Tambuyukon and 2,670 to 3,426 m on Mt. Kinabalu. They are most abundant in higher altitude dwarf forest and montane scrubland. The rat populations from these two peaks were connected in the Holocene. However, nowadays they are genetically isolated despite being 18 km apart. With current predictions of Global warming, the suitable habitat for Rattus baluensis is expected to shift around 500 m upwards. This will put the population in Mount Tambuyukon at risk. However, the population in Mount Kinabalu will likely survive in its upper slopes. Genetic analysis situate its origin in a local population of Rattus tiomanicus from northern Borneo at around 300-400 thousand years ago.

The summit rat has a mutualistic relationship with a species of giant pitcher plant, Nepenthes rajah. Like the treeshrew Tupaia montana, it defecates into the plant's traps while visiting them to feed on sweet, fruity secretions from glands on the pitcher lids.
