= Nepenthes infauna =

Organisms that inhabit the pitchers of Nepenthes plants

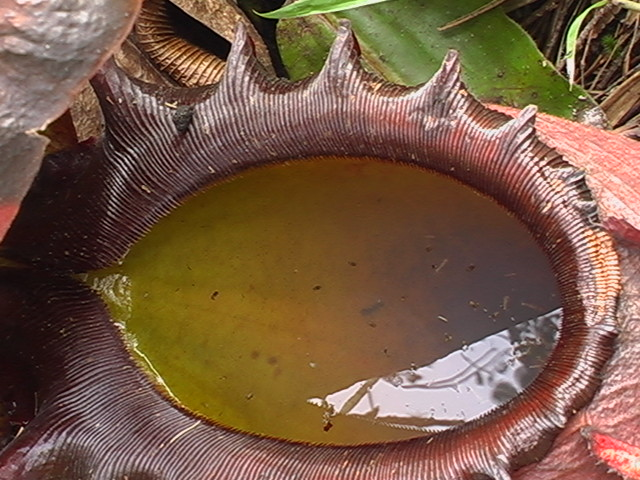
Infaunal mosquito larvae in the pitcher fluid of Nepenthes rajah

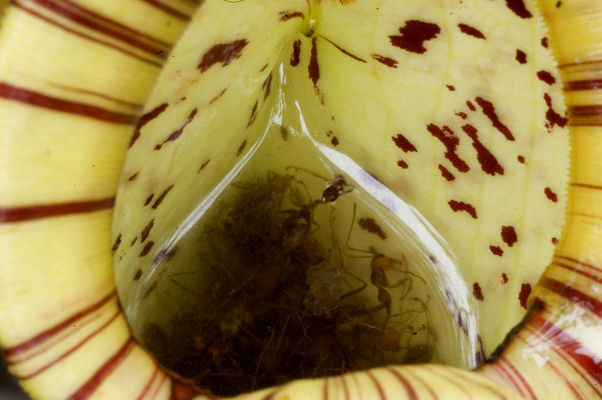
Accumulation of prey, such as in this Nepenthes rafflesiana pitcher, may attract nepenthexenes.

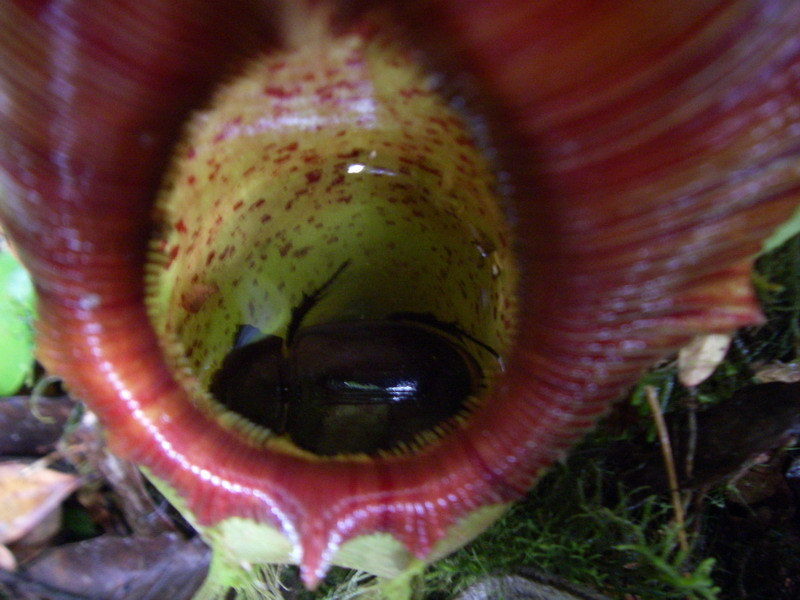
Recently drowned insects, such as this large beetle caught by Nepenthes ovata, constitute basal species in the pitcher food web and are consumed by the infauna.

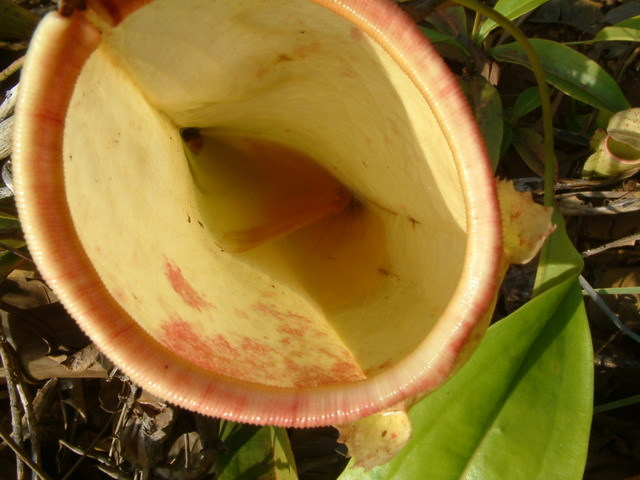
Moth caught by an upper pitcher of Nepenthes neoguineensis

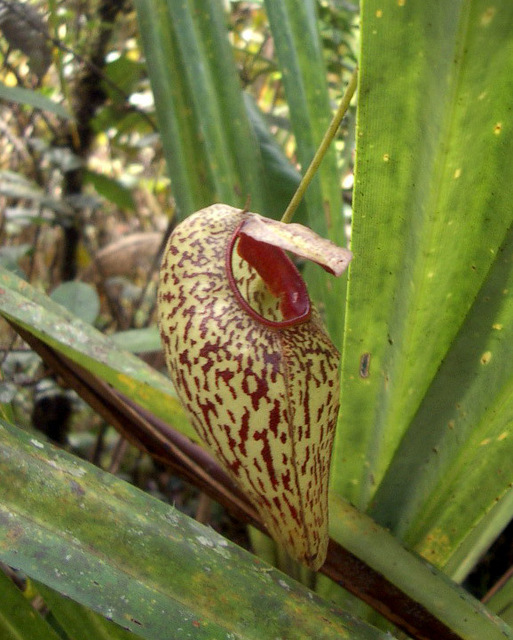
No infaunal organisms have been recorded from the pitchers of Nepenthes aristolochioides. It is thought that the structure of the traps may serve to disorientate emerging adults and so infaunal species may avoid colonising them.

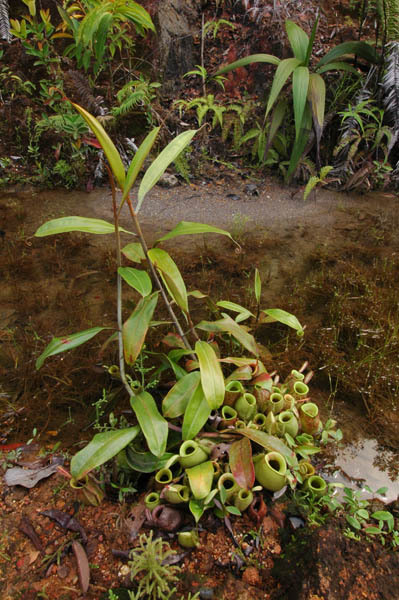
In 1991, a study was carried out on the pitcher infauna of Nepenthes ampullaria, a species that is partially detritivorous.

Nepenthes infauna are the organisms that inhabit the pitchers of Nepenthes plants. These include fly and midge larvae, spiders, mites, ants, and a species of crab, Geosesarma malayanum. The most common and conspicuous predators found in pitchers are mosquito larvae, which consume large numbers of other larvae during their development. Many of these animals are so specialised that they cannot survive anywhere else, and are referred to as nepenthebionts.

The complex relationships between these various organisms are not yet fully understood. The question of whether infaunal animals "steal" food from their hosts, or whether they are involved in a mutually beneficial (symbiotic) association has yet to be investigated experimentally and is the source of considerable debate. Charles Clarke suggests that mutualism is a "likely situation", whereby "the infauna receives domicile, protection and food from the plant, while in return, the infauna helps to break down the prey, increase the rate of digestion and keep bacterial numbers low".

== Classification ==
=== Nepenthebionts ===
Nepenthebionts are animals which are specialised to live inside Nepenthes pitchers and are totally dependent on them at least at some stage of their lives. Many species of mosquito larvae fall into this category. Examples include Culex rajah and Toxorhynchites rajah, which are named after Nepenthes rajah, as well as the related species Culex jenseni and Uranotaenia moultoni.

=== Nepenthephiles ===
Nepenthephiles are organisms that are frequently found in Nepenthes pitchers, but which are not completely dependent on them at any stage of their lives. Most animals that coexist with Nepenthes fall into this category. Examples include Henriksenia nepenthicola, a crab spider that feeds on flies caught by Nepenthes, and Geosesarma malayanum, a species of crab.

=== Nepenthexenes ===
Nepenthexenes are animals which are not normally associated with pitchers, but which are occasionally encountered in them. These are usually found if a pitcher becomes overloaded with putrefying prey, when it may be colonised by the larvae of various fly species. These simply feed on rotting matter regardless of whether it is found in pitchers.

== Diversity ==
In a 1991 study, a wide diversity of animals was found in pitchers of Nepenthes ampullaria:

Carrion feeders:

- Endonepenthia (Phoridae)
- Syrphidae

Filter feeders:

- Aedes albopictus, Culex coerulescens, Culex hewitti, Culex navalis, Tripteroides nepenthis, Tripteroides tenax, Uranotaenia moultoni (Culicidae)

Detritus feeders:

- several Anoetidae
- Dasyhelea, Forcipomyia (Ceratopogonidae)
- several Chironomidae
- Harpacticoida
- Sciaridae

Nipping predators (can swim in the fluid, mandibles move against one another in a horizontal plane):

- Aedes brevitibia, Toxorhynchites indicus (Culicidae)
- Corethrella calathicola (Chaoboridae)

Hooking predators (can only crawl, mandibles move parallel to one another in a vertical plane):

- Dolichopodidae
- Listodiplosis (Cecidomyiidae)
- Nepenthosyrphus (Syrphidae)

Terrestrial predators:

- Misumenops (Thomisidae)
- Xenoplatyura (Mycetophilidae)

Nepenthebiont Diptera:

- Aedes brevitibia
- several Chironomidae
- Corethrella calathicola
- Culex hewitti
- Culex coerulescens
- Culex navalis
- several Dasyhelea species (D. ampullariae, D. biseriata and others)
- Dolichopodidae
- Endonepenthia
- Nepenthosyrphus
- Toxorhynchites indicus
- Tripteroides nepenthis
- Tripteroides tenax
- Uranotaenia moultoni

== See also ==
- Tripteroides sp. No. 2
- Phytotelmata
- Wyeomyia smithii
- Thomisus nepenthiphilus (Thomisidae) and Anelosimus decaryi (Theridiidae), two spider species described from Nepenthes
