= Culex rajah =

- Culex rajah from type description

Scientific classification
- Domain: Eukaryota
- Kingdom: Animalia
- Phylum: Arthropoda
- Class: Insecta
- Order: Diptera
- Family: Culicidae
- Genus: Culex
- Species: C. rajah

Binomial name
- Culex rajah Tsukamoto, 1986

Species of mosquito

Culex rajah is a species of mosquito in the genus Culex. It is endemic to Sabah, Malaysian Borneo. C. rajah is placed in the subgenus Culiciomyia. In its larval stage, C. rajah is found exclusively in the pitchers of Nepenthes rajah (hence the name), a species of pitcher plant. As such, it is considered a nepenthebiont.
