= Nan Fairbrother =

English writer and lecturer (1913–1971)

Nancy Mary Fairbrother (1913–1971) was an English writer and lecturer on landscape and land use. She was a member of the UK Institute of Landscape Architects, now the Landscape Institute. Her brother, James Alick (Rex) Fairbrother, was also a landscape architect.

== Early life ==
Fairbrother was born in Coventry, England, and attended the University of London, graduating with honours in English. After graduation, she worked as a hospital physiotherapist, before settling in London. In 1939 she married William McKenzie, a physician. Their son, Dan McKenzie, was a Cambridge geophysicist instrumental in developing plate tectonics. During World War II, Fairbrother left London with their two sons for the safety of the Buckinghamshire countryside, and wrote her first book, Children in the House (1954), about the experience of living there while her husband was away serving with the Royal Air Force (RAF).

== Landscape architect ==
Fairbrother's second book was Men and Gardens (1956). In it she observed that because "human beings are gregarious creatures, there are many things we share quite happily with our neighbors. But gardens are not one of them."

Fairbrother's most celebrated work is New Lives, New Landscapes (1970), a visionary account of the challenges facing land-use planning in the United Kingdom.

Fairbrother's influence on planners, landscape architects, and educators continued after her death. In 1987 the Fairbrother Group of urban wildlife organisations was established and named in her memory, which ultimately became the Urban Wildlife Network. In 2009, BBC Scotland Learning produced two programmes in their Industry series (first televised in January 2009), titled New lives, new landscapes, an acknowledgment of Fairbrother's contribution. In 2010, members of the Landscape Institute voted New Lives, New Landscapes one of the top five books for landscape architects. In The Architectural Review in 2015, Timothy Brittain-Catlin described the book:

"It is, essentially, a piece of 'research through practice' of breathtaking force .... She cannot be patronised as a clever practitioner with empirical ideas; the book was as important to the creation of landscape thinking as would be an academic thesis by a philosopher to the discipline of philosophy."

In 2023, there was the publication of an edited collection of essays called New Lives, New Landscapes Revisited (OUP), which sought to bring a fresh historical perspective to bear on Fairbrother's concerns.

== Bibliography ==
- Children in the House (Hogarth, 1954). Published in the US as An English Year (Knopf, 1954)
- Men and Gardens (Hogarth, 1956)
- The Cheerful Day (Hogarth, 1960)
- The House (Hogarth, 1965). Published in the US as The House in the Country (Knopf, 1965)
- New Lives, New Landscapes (Architectural Press, 1970, winner of the WH Smith Literary Award)
- Shelter (Penguin Education, 1972)
- The Nature of Landscape Design: As an art form, a craft, a social necessity; with a foreword by F. Fraser Darling (Architectural Press, 1974)
- Connexions (Puffin, 1974)
