= Geosesarma malayanum =

Scientific classification
- Kingdom: Animalia
- Phylum: Arthropoda
- Clade: Pancrustacea
- Class: Malacostraca
- Order: Decapoda
- Suborder: Pleocyemata
- Infraorder: Brachyura
- Family: Sesarmidae
- Genus: Geosesarma
- Species: G. malayanum

Binomial name
- Geosesarma malayanum Ng & Lim, 1986

Species of crab

Geosesarma malayanum is a species of small red crab found in Malaysia. It is famous for its relationship with pitcher plants; as such, it is classified as a nepenthephile. G. malayanum is known to visit Nepenthes ampullaria plants and raid the pitchers of their contents. It uses its claws to crush and consume the drowned prey. However, the crabs are reportedly trapped by pitchers in Brunei occasionally.
