= Tim Fairbrother =

New Zealand rugby player (born 1982)

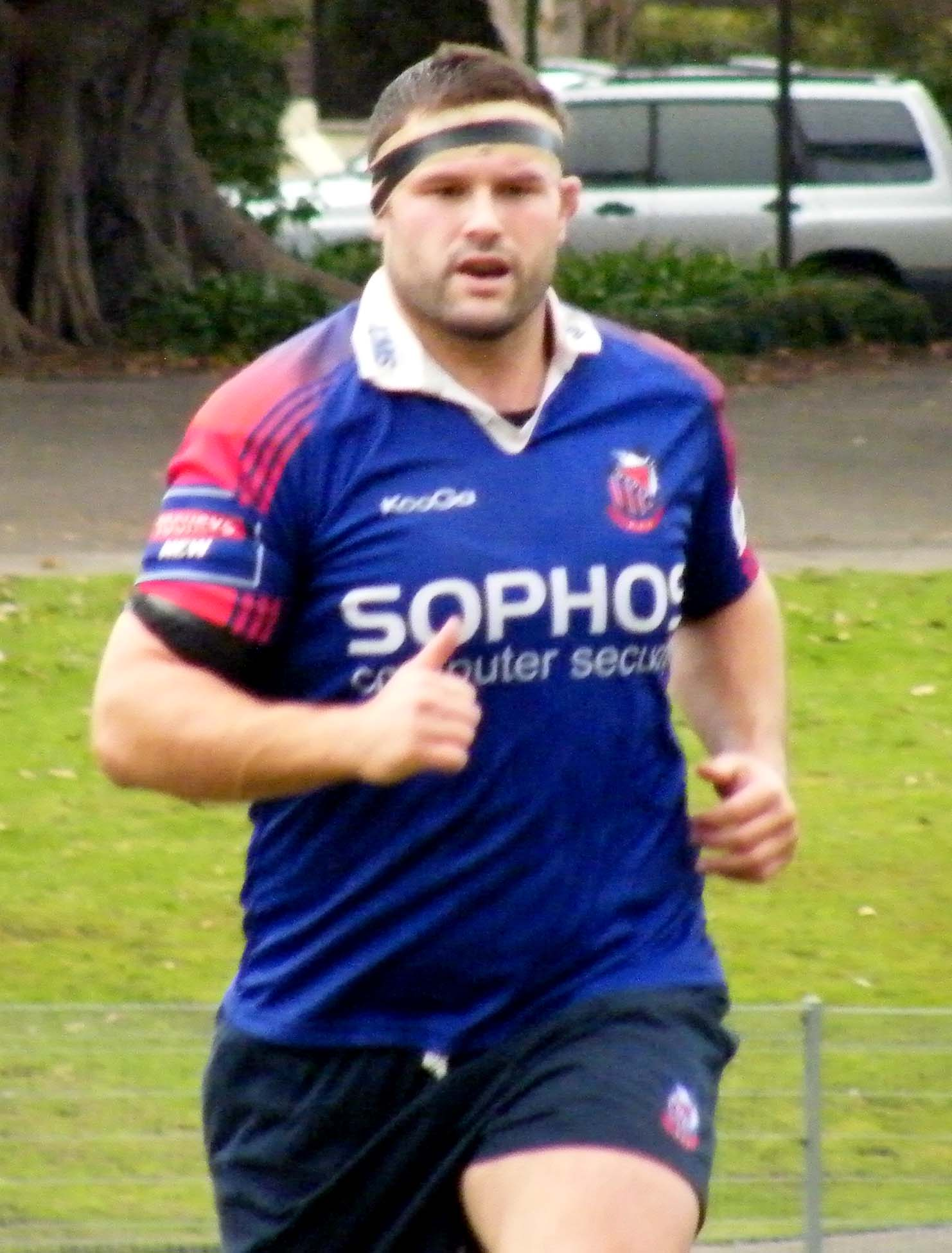
- Fairbrother in 2007
- Born: Tim Fairbrother; 12 March 1982 (age 44) Upper Hutt, New Zealand
- Height: 1.83 m (6 ft 0 in)
- Weight: 112 kg (17 st 9 lb)
- School: St. Patrick‘s College, Silverstream

Rugby union career
- Position: Tighthead prop
Senior career
Years	Team	Apps	(Points)
2001–03	Wellington		
2003–09	Hurricanes	53	(5)
2009–11	Western Force	23	(20)
2011–12	Harlequins	13	(0)

Tim Fairbrother (born 12 March 1982) is a New Zealand rugby union player, his position was tighthead prop.

Fairbrother featured through the New Zealand rugby junior representative team setup and made his first class debut for local Province Wellington at just 19. Two years later he was called up to play for Regional side the Hurricanes in the then Super 14. Fairbrother played for the Hurricanes for seven years but was plagued by injury, including missing almost the entire 2007 Super Rugby season, and was unable to break into the All Blacks squad.

In 2009, Fairbrother left New Zealand for Australia, signing for the Western Force on a two-year contract. Tim is qualified to play for Australia (and England) through his grandparents but was not selected by the Wallabies coaches and, feeling he had "[given] it [his] best crack", decided to move on again joining Harlequins.

Fairbrother was the most experienced front row player at Harlequins. He came off the bench in the first round of the 2011–12 Aviva Premiership and proceeded to start in the following 5 games, but his season was interrupted by injury twice and he missed the last three months the season.

Following the first round of the 2012–13 season Harlequins announced that the club had agreed to release Fairbrother from his contract to allow him to return to New Zealand.

== Post-playing Career ==
Fairbrother continued to play rugby in a part-time capacity for Manly before signing on as their Director of Rugby in 2014 until 2015.

Fairbrother is now the CEO of Ocean Underwriting, based in Sydney.
