= Mount Tambuyukon =

Mountain in Sabah, Malaysia

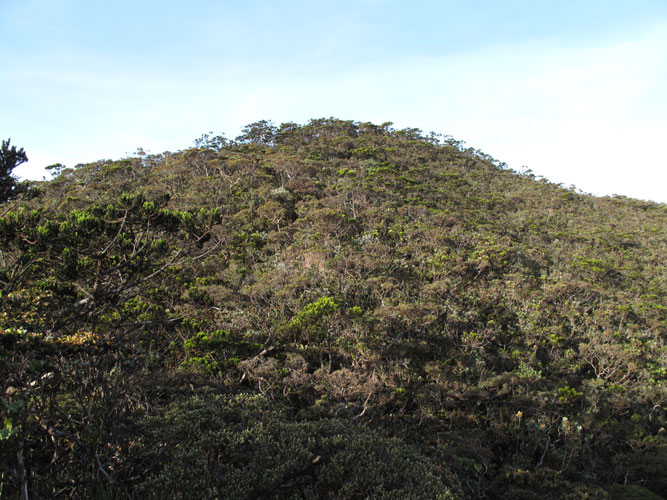
- Summit of Mount Tambuyukon.

Highest point
- Elevation: 2,579 m (8,461 ft)
- Prominence: 833 m (2,733 ft)
- Listing: Spesial Ribu
- Coordinates: 6°12′31″N 116°39′29″E

Naming
- Native name: Gunung Tambuyukon (Malay); Nulu Tambuyukon (Kadazan Dusun)

Geography
- Location within Malaysia
- Location: Ranau, West Coast Division, Sabah, Malaysia; Kota Belud, West Coast Division, Sabah, Malaysia; Kota Marudu, Kudat Division, Sabah, Malaysia
- Parent range: Crocker Range

Mount Tambuyukon or Tamboyukon (Malay: Gunung Tambuyukon, Dusun: Nulu Tambuyukon) is a mountain located at the West Coast and Kudat divisions of Sabah, Malaysia (located on the tripoints of three districts namely Ranau, Kota Belud as well as Kota Marudu). It is considered the third or fourth-highest mountain in the country with height at 2,579 metres (8,461 ft), lying north of the highest Mount Kinabalu.

== Geology ==
The glaciated summit plateaus and Pleistocene glacial tills of the Kinabalu area including similar deposits near to Mount Tambuyukon indicate that the summits of Tambuyukon, Kinabalu and possibly Trusmadi were significantly higher than other parts of the Crocker Range by the Pleistocene. Together with Mount Kinabalu, it is part of the Wariu Formation.

== Biodiversity ==
The mountain supports a wide range of unique flora and fauna, including a number of pitcher plant species of the genus Nepenthes. A mammal survey in 2012 and 2013 from 300 metres (984 ft) to the summit, recorded the second known population of the summit rat, and a total of 44 mammal species.

== Features ==
There are two climbing trails towards the mountain summit, one from Monggis village and the other from the Sabah Parks substation in the same village, both located in the Kota Marudu district next to its border with Ranau district, for a permit from the park authority needs to be obtained before climbing. The mountain is considered one of Sabah's ecotourism destinations, albeit minorly.

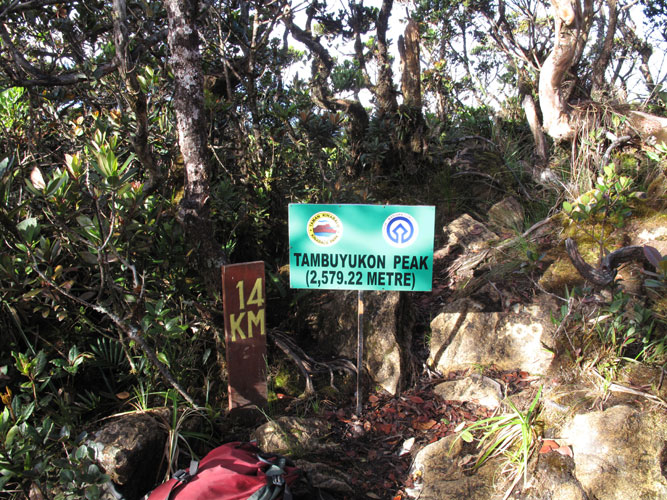
The mountain peak signboard.

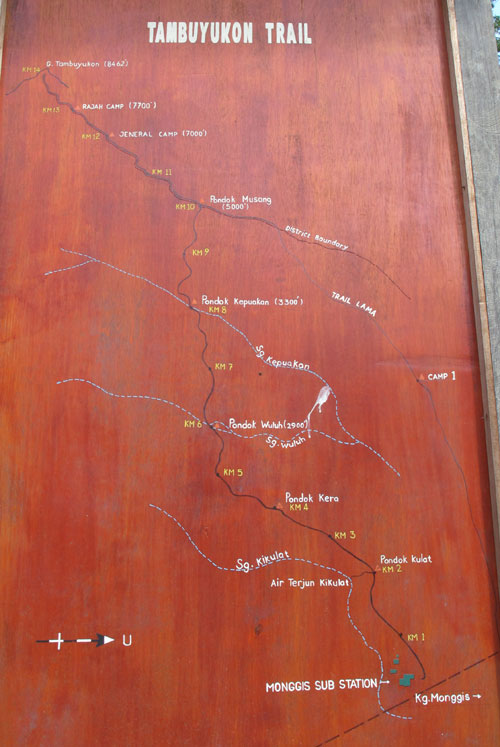
The mountain trail.

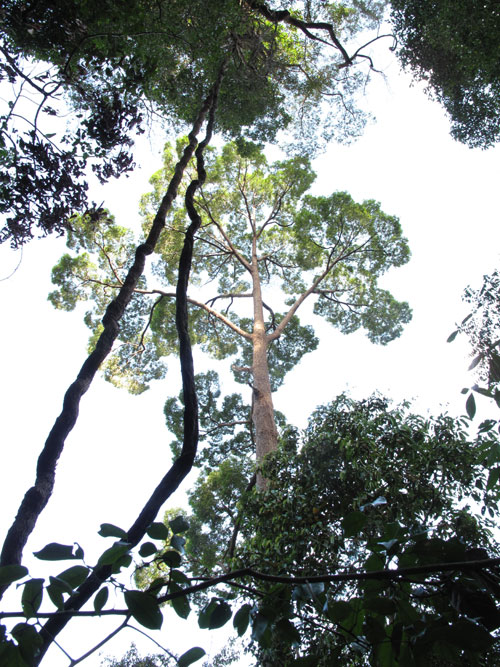
Trees on the mountain.

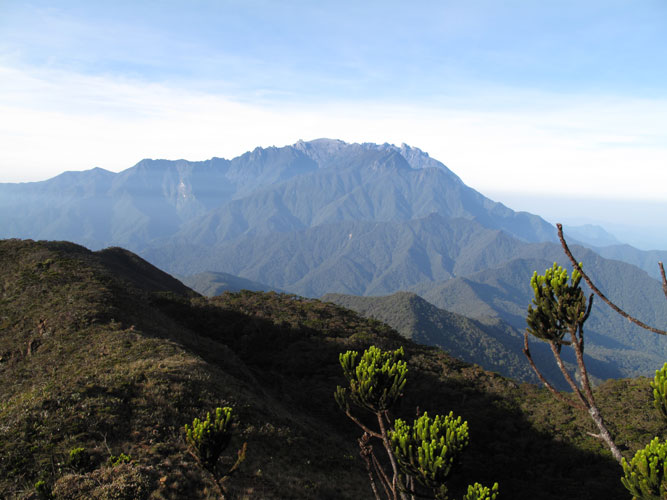
Mount Kinabalu from Mount Tambuyukon
