= Uranotaenia moultoni =

Scientific classification
- Domain: Eukaryota
- Kingdom: Animalia
- Phylum: Arthropoda
- Class: Insecta
- Order: Diptera
- Family: Culicidae
- Genus: Uranotaenia
- Subgenus: Pseudoficalbia
- Species: U. moultoni

Binomial name
- Uranotaenia moultoni (Edwards, 1914)

Species of fly

Uranotaenia moultoni is a species of mosquito in the genus Uranotaenia. It is endemic to Sabah, Malaysian Borneo. U. moultoni is placed in the subgenus Pseudoficalbia. In its larval stage, U. moultoni develops in the pitchers of Nepenthes species. As such, it is considered a nepenthebiont.
