= Toxorhynchites rajah =

- Toxorhynchites rajah from type description

Scientific classification
- Domain: Eukaryota
- Kingdom: Animalia
- Phylum: Arthropoda
- Class: Insecta
- Order: Diptera
- Family: Culicidae
- Genus: Toxorhynchites
- Species: T. rajah

Binomial name
- Toxorhynchites rajah Tsukamoto, 1986

Species of fly

Toxorhynchites rajah is a species of mosquito in the genus Toxorhynchites. It is endemic to Sabah, Malaysian Borneo. In its larval stage, T. rajah is found exclusively in the pitchers of Nepenthes rajah (hence the name), a species of pitcher plant. As such, it is considered a nepenthebiont.
