= Jade Fairbrother =

South African model (born 1986)

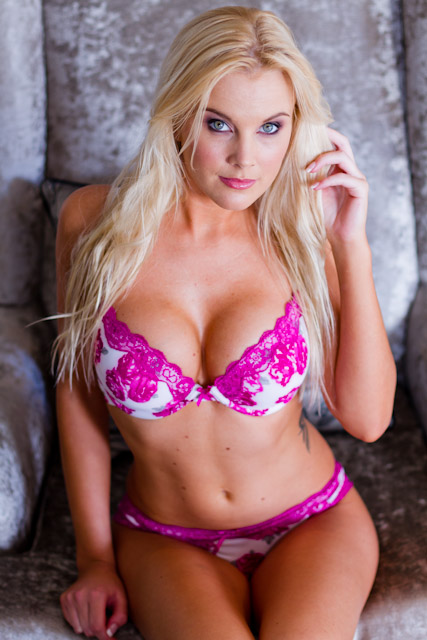
- Born: Jade Fairbrother; 19 October 1986 (age 40); Cape Town, Western Cape, South Africa
- Years active: 2011–present
- Height: 1.61 m (5 ft 3 1/2 in)

Jade Fairbrother (born 19 October 1986) is a South African model, fitness bikini competitor, international Playboy Playmate of the Year, and celebrity ambassador. In April 2013, Fairbrother decided to change her career focus to other more long-term opportunities and did her last professional photo-shoot in April 2013. After becoming a mother in 2014, Fairbrother has returned to the limelight in 2015 with the addition of ‘fitness bikini competitor’ to her list of titles.

== Early life ==
Fairbrother was born in Cape Town, Western Cape, South Africa. She is an only child to entrepreneurial parents. Growing up, Fairbrother attended Springfield Convent private school, and participated in a variety of activities including dance, debate, and writing. She matriculated in 2004 and then enrolled in university to study Psychology and Criminology.

== Career ==
=== Modelling ===
After some informal modeling in her younger years, Fairbrother gained public attention at the age of 24 when she posed for a pictorial in South Africa edition of Playboy as Miss September 2011 Playboy Playmate. Following her September shoot, she modeled for the New Zealand clothing company Ruby in their lingerie and swimwear fashion show. In December 2011, Fairbrother filmed a German BMW television advertisement.

In the beginning of 2012, Fairbrother posed for Ty-Rok clothing, Passion Fruit Lingerie and Uwe Koetter Jewellers. Then in February, she became Playboy South Africa's first ever Playmate of the Year for 2012. This announcement was made by Hugh Hefner via a video message. Fairbrother was featured on the cover of the March 2012 issue and was awarded a variety of prizes including a trip to the Playboy Mansion in Los Angeles, United States.

Following her Playmate of the Year title, she was one of the main features in Young & Rubicam's national advertising campaign for Playboy South Africa, entitled: 'More than just a centerfold.' Fairbrother's pictures have also been published internationally by Playboy Slovenia, Playboy Portugal, Playboy Croatia, Playboy Argentina as well as Playboy Germany and Playboy France. She has also featured and obtained Playmate titles in Playboy Hungary 'Miss November 2012' and Playboy Croatia 'Miss December 2012'.

In January 2013, Fairbrother won the title of 'Bounce girl of the Year' for 2012 with The Bounce. Then in June 2013 placed in the top ten finalists of the SA Swimsuit competition and was among the top five "people's choice" through their online poll. Fairbrother went on to win the Col'cacchio Celebrity Chef series for 2013 and raised R339225.00 for the Red Cross War Memorial Children's Hospital, her winning pizza has been the best seller out of all their Celebrity Chef series. Following that Fairbrother was featured on the cover of the August 2013 Wine Extra magazine. Then October 2013 saw Fairbrother place in the top twenty finalists for their 'Beach body of the Year' competition with Women's Health – while being three months pregnant.

Fairbrother went dormant for a time while; enjoying her pregnancy, time off and motherhood. She resurfaced with international Playboy pictorials features for Playboy Netherlands in both July and November 2014.

=== Appearances ===
Fairbrother has been featured on many local and internationals sites and in blogs worldwide; as well as being named Playboy South Africa's Playmate of the day several times. She is also regularly featured on SAbabes.net.

In January 2013, Fairbrother was awarded Bounce Girl of the Year for 2012. Around the same time, she was picked as one of Fashion One's new African presenters. Fairbrother has been interviewed on roughly twenty radio stations nationally, including stations such as 5fm and Heart FM. She has been featured numerous times in various national newspapers and on TV shows, including M-Net’s All Access and SABC breakfast show Expresso.

=== Celebrity ambassador ===
From 2011 Fairbrother's official ambassadorships and sponsorships have included: Playboy South Africa, 360 Specialised Personal Training, A to Z Lazer, BriteSmile South Africa, Cintron Africa alongside international musician and celebrity Akon, Legs Eleven - IPL Hair Removal, Minx by Dranged Lifestyle Clothing, Stellenbosch Nutrition, SeaWeeds Swimwear, Bronze International, Mirrors Hair Lab, NM2D2, Village & Life, Your Highness, City Slicker Limousines, BODYTEC, ColCacchio South Africa, Opulent Living and Exclusive Beverages.

During 2012 Ballz Visual Radio station also contracted Fairbrother to present their weekly Bikini Weather show, where she presented worldwide weather in a bikini to an international following.

Even in 2015 Fairbrother's large social media following and public influence has seen her secure ambassadorships and sponsorships with brands such as Heels2Heaven, NAKD Luxury Tanning Studio, Hair By Sarah (Tape-In Hair Extensions) and SammyDress.

Fairbrother has continued to be influential in the public eye, thus securing her further ambassadorships with LightInTheBox and Sheriff Training Systems (STS).

=== Fitness bikini competitor ===
2015 saw Fairbrother return to the public eye in better physical shape than ever before. She has moved away from commercial modelling to focus on being on stage - opposed to in front of the camera. Fairbrother is now competing professionally as a Fitness Bikini Athlete.

In April 2015, she placed third in her first ever fitness competition – ROSSI: Extreme Bodies 2015 – in the ‘Miss Bikini’ division. Thereafter she placed fifth at the IFBB: 2015 Novice Show in the ‘Fitness Bikini Model’ division and following that she placed third again at the IBFF 2015 Launch Show in the ‘Miss Fitness Model’ division.

She has gone on to place sixth in 'Fitness Bikini' at the NABBA: Pretoria Classic in May 2015 as well as seventh in both the 'Miss Bikini' and 'Miss Fitness Bikini' at the ROSSI: Grand Prix. In September 2015 Fairbrother was invited and hosted as a special guest athlete to compete in the annual Mr and Miss Fitness show held in Cape Town where she took third place in the 'Miss Bikini' division.

Continuing with her fitness journey Fairbrother was back on stage in April 2016 where she placed 6th in the 'Fitness Bikini' lineup at the ROSSI: Extreme Bodies and then taking the 6th placing in the 'Miss Bikini' division at the NABBA: Pretoria Classic in May.

In June 2016, she placed first in the 'Ms Fitness Bikini' lineup at the IBFF: Redemption Classic which was a qualifier for the 2016 National show, where Fairbrother has been invited to representing Gauteng. The very next weekend saw Fairbrother take third place in IFBB's Muscle Mulisha Grand Prix 'Fitness Bikini' lineup.

Come July she took first place in IFBB: Miss SA Extreme's 'Fitness Bikini' lineup which also secured her an invite to compete at the Arnolds Classic Africa in 2017.

== Personal life ==
Fairbrother has been married since February 2012. Her husband, Brendon, is also known professionally for being her manager.
