= Japanese Journal of Tropical Medicine and Hygiene =

- Discipline: Tropical medicine
- Language: English
- ISO 4: Find out here

Indexing
- ISSN: 1349-4147

Links
- Journal homepage

The Japanese Journal of Tropical Medicine and Hygiene (Japanese: Nippon Nettai Igakkai zasshi, print ISSN 1348-8945, electronic ISSN 1349-4147) is a Japanese medical journal. It was established in 1973 and changed its name to Tropical Medicine and Health in 2004. Originally published in Japanese it is now published in English. It is the official journal of the Japanese Society of Tropical Medicine.

It is indexed by CAB International.

== See also ==
- Tropical medicine
