= David E. Fairbrothers =

American botanist

David E. Fairbrothers was an American botanist, Professor Emeritus and former chair of the Department of Biological Sciences of Rutgers University. In 1989, the Botanical Society of America gave him the Merit Award, their highest honor. The D. E. Fairbrothers Plant Resource Center at Rutgers is named in his honor.
