= Tannin =

Class of astringent, bitter plant polyphenolic chemical compounds

Representative chemical structure of tannic acid, a type of tannin

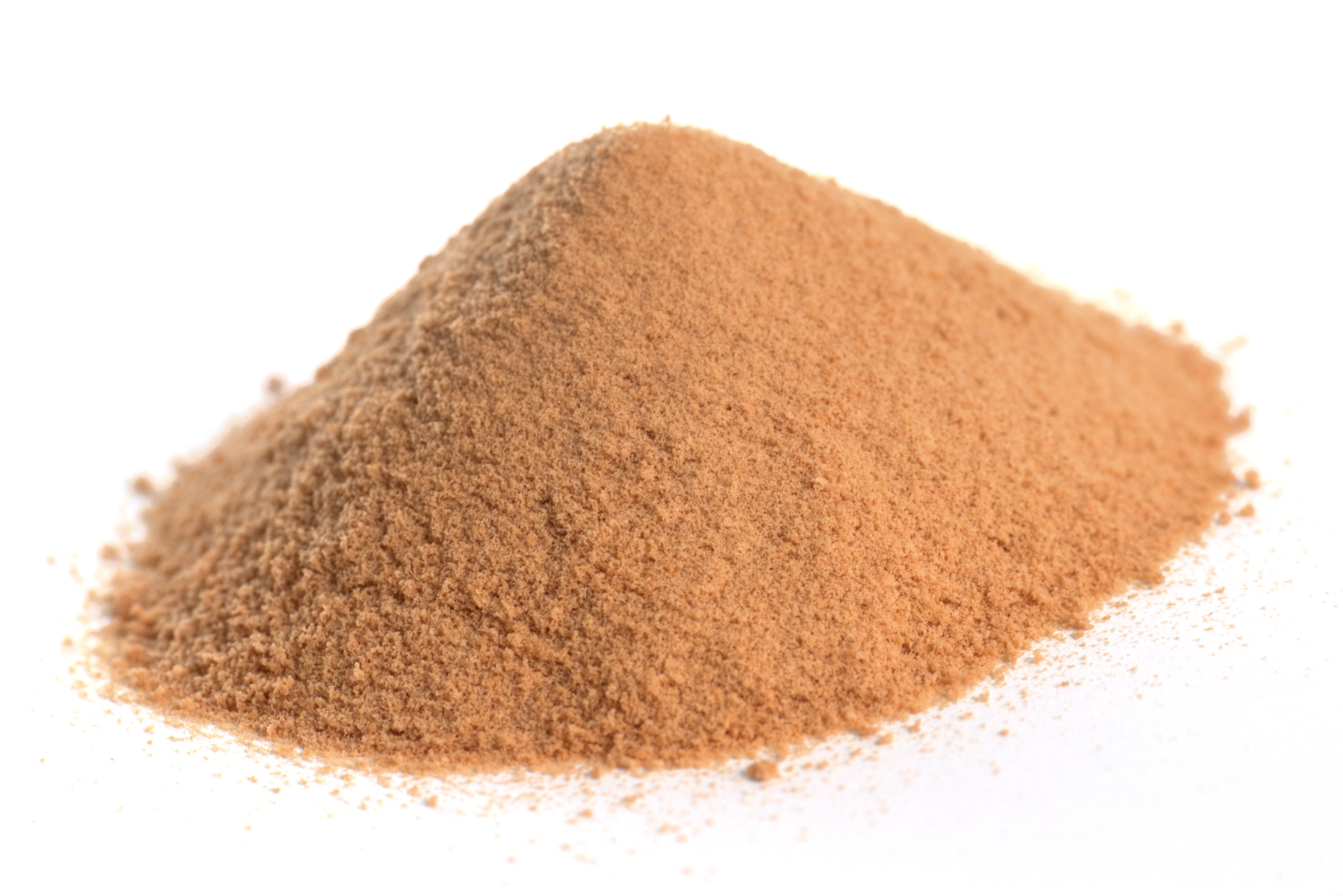
Tannin powder (mixture of compounds)

Tannins (or tannoids) are a class of astringent, polyphenolic biomolecules that bind to and precipitate proteins and various other organic compounds including amino acids and alkaloids. The term tannin is widely applied to any large polyphenolic compound containing sufficient hydroxyls and other suitable groups (such as carboxyls) to form strong compounds with various macromolecules.

The term tannin (from scientific French tannin, from French tan "crushed oak bark", tanner "to tan", cognate with English tanning, Medieval Latin tannare, from Proto-Celtic *tannos "oak") refers to the abundance of these compounds in oak bark, which was used in tanning animal hides into leather.

The tannin compounds are widely distributed in many species of plants, where they play a role in protection from predation (acting as pesticides) and might help in regulating plant growth. The astringency from the tannins is what causes the dry and puckery feeling in the mouth following the consumption of unripened fruit, red wine or tea. Likewise, the destruction or modification of tannins with time plays an important role when determining harvesting times.

Tannins have molecular weights ranging from 500 to over 3,000 (gallic acid esters) and up to 20,000 daltons (proanthocyanidins).

== Structure and classes of tannins ==
There are three major classes of tannins: Shown below are the base unit or monomer of the tannin. Particularly in the flavone-derived tannins, the base shown must be (additionally) heavily hydroxylated and polymerized in order to give the high molecular weight polyphenol motif that characterizes tannins. Typically, tannin molecules require at least 12 hydroxyl groups and at least five phenyl groups to function as protein binders.

Base unit / scaffold	Gallic acid	Phloroglucinol	Flavan-3-ol	
Polymer class	Hydrolyzable tannins	Phlorotannins	Condensed tannins	Phlobatannins (C-ring isomerized condensed tannins)
Sources	Plants	Brown algae	Plants	Tree heartwood

Oligostilbenoids (oligostilbenes or polystilbenes) are oligomeric forms of stilbenoids and constitute a minor class of tannins.

=== Pseudo-tannins ===
Pseudo-tannins are low molecular weight compounds associated with other compounds. They do not change color during the Goldbeater's skin test, unlike hydrolysable and condensed tannins, and cannot be used as tanning compounds. Some examples of pseudo-tannins and their sources are:

Pseudo tannin	Source(s)
Gallic acid	Rhubarb
Flavan-3-ols (Catechins)	Tea, acacia, catechu, cocoa, guarana
Chlorogenic acid	Nux-vomica, coffee, mate
Ipecacuanhic acid	Carapichea ipecacuanha

== History ==
Ellagic acid, gallic acid, and pyrogallic acid were first discovered by chemist Henri Braconnot in 1831. Julius Löwe was the first person to synthesize ellagic acid by heating gallic acid with arsenic acid or silver oxide.

Maximilian Nierenstein studied natural phenols and tannins found in different plant species. Working with Arthur George Perkin, he prepared ellagic acid from algarobilla and certain other fruits in 1905. He suggested its formation from galloyl-glycine by Penicillium in 1915. Tannase is an enzyme that Nierenstein used to produce m-digallic acid from gallotannins. He proved the presence of catechin in cocoa beans in 1931. He showed in 1945 that luteic acid, a molecule present in the myrobalanitannin, a tannin found in the fruit of Terminalia chebula, is an intermediary compound in the synthesis of ellagic acid.

At these times, molecule formulas were determined through combustion analysis. The discovery in 1943 by Martin and Synge of paper chromatography provided for the first time the means of surveying the phenolic constituents of plants and for their separation and identification. There was an explosion of activity in this field after 1945, including prominent work by Edgar Charles Bate-Smith and Tony Swain at Cambridge University.

In 1966, Edwin Haslam proposed a first comprehensive definition of plant polyphenols based on the earlier proposals of Bate-Smith, Swain and Theodore White, which includes specific structural characteristics common to all phenolics having a tanning property. It is referred to as the White–Bate-Smith–Swain–Haslam (WBSSH) definition.

== Occurrence ==
Tannins are distributed in species throughout the plant kingdom. They are commonly found in both gymnosperms and angiosperms. Mole (1993) studied the distribution of tannin in 180 families of dicotyledons and 44 families of monocotyledons (Cronquist). Most families of dicot contain tannin-free species (tested by their ability to precipitate proteins). The best known families of which all species tested contain tannin are: Aceraceae, Actinidiaceae, Anacardiaceae, Bixaceae, Burseraceae, Combretaceae, Dipterocarpaceae, Ericaceae, Grossulariaceae, Myricaceae for dicot and Najadaceae and Typhaceae in Monocot. To the family of the oak, Fagaceae, 73% of the species tested contain tannin. For those of acacias, Mimosaceae, only 39% of the species tested contain tannin, among Solanaceae rate drops to 6% and 4% for the Asteraceae. Some families like the Boraginaceae, Cucurbitaceae, Papaveraceae contain no tannin-rich species.

The most abundant polyphenols are the condensed tannins, found in virtually all families of plants, and comprising up to 50% of the dry weight of leaves.

=== Cellular localization ===
In all vascular plants studied, tannins are manufactured by a chloroplast-derived organelle, the tannosome. Tannins are located mainly in the vacuoles of plants.

Tannins are classified as ergastic substances, non-protoplasm materials found in cells. Tannins, by definition, precipitate proteins. In this condition, they must be stored in organelles able to withstand the protein precipitation process. Idioblasts are isolated plant cells which differ from neighboring tissues and contain non-living substances. They have various functions, such as storage of reserves, excretory materials, pigments, minerals, and tannins.

In Japanese persimmon (Diospyros kaki) fruits, tannin is accumulated in the vacuole of tannin cells, which are idioblasts of parenchyma cells in the flesh.

=== Presence in soils ===
The convergent evolution of tannin-rich plant communities has occurred on nutrient-poor acidic soils throughout the world. Tannins were once believed to function as anti-herbivore defenses, but more and more ecologists now recognize them as important controllers of decomposition and nitrogen cycling processes. As concern grows about global warming, there is great interest to better understand the role of polyphenols as regulators of carbon cycling, in particular in northern boreal forests.

Leaf litter and other decaying parts of kauri (Agathis australis), a tree species found in New Zealand, decompose much more slowly than those of most other species. Besides its acidity, the plant also bears substances such as waxes and phenols, most notably tannins, that are harmful to microorganisms.

=== Presence in water and wood ===
The leaching of highly water-soluble tannins from decaying vegetation and leaves along a stream may produce what is known as a blackwater river. Water flowing out of bogs has a characteristic brown color from dissolved peat tannins. The presence of tannins (or humic acid) in well water can make it smell bad or taste bitter, but this does not make it unsafe to drink.

Tannins leaching from an unprepared driftwood decoration in an aquarium can cause pH lowering and coloring of the water to a tea-like tinge. A way to avoid this is to boil the wood in water several times, discarding the water each time. Using peat as an aquarium substrate can have the same effect. Many hours of boiling the driftwood may need to be followed by many weeks or months of constant soaking and many water changes before the water will stay clear. Raising the water's pH level, for example by adding baking soda, will accelerate the process of leaching.

Tannins in water can lead to feather staining on wild and domestic waterfowl which frequent the water; mute swans, which are typically white in colour, can often be observed with reddish-brown staining as a result of coming into contact with dissolved tannins, though dissolved iron compounds also play a role.

Softwoods, while in general much lower in tannins than hardwoods, are usually not recommended for use in an aquarium so using a hardwood with a very light color, indicating a low tannin content, can be an easy way to avoid tannins. Tannic acid is brown in color, so in general white woods have a low tannin content. Woods with a lot of yellow, red, or brown coloration to them (like cedar, redwood, red oak, etc.) tend to contain a lot of tannin.

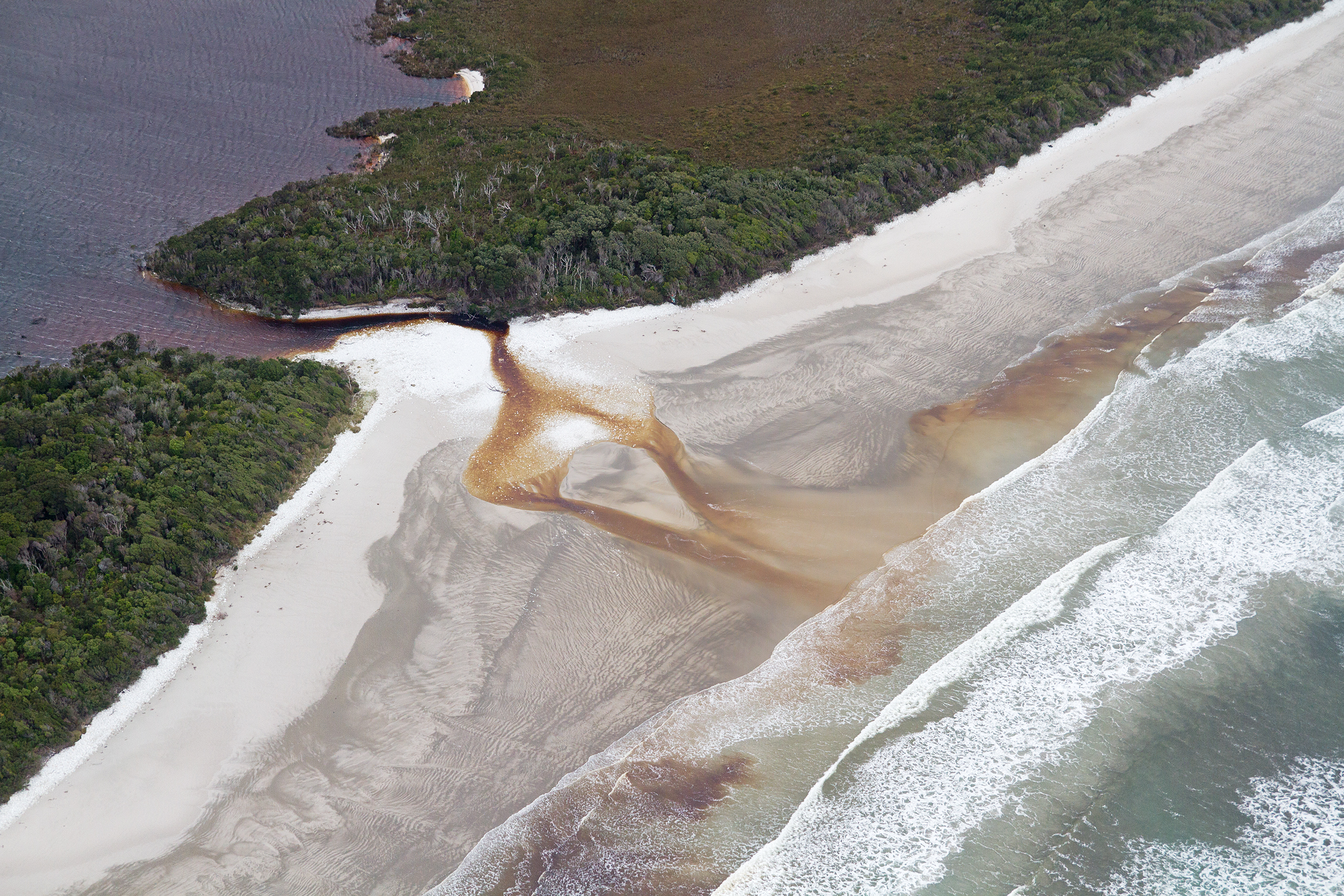
Tannin-rich fresh water draining into Cox Bight from Freney Lagoon, Southwest Conservation Area, Tasmania, Australia

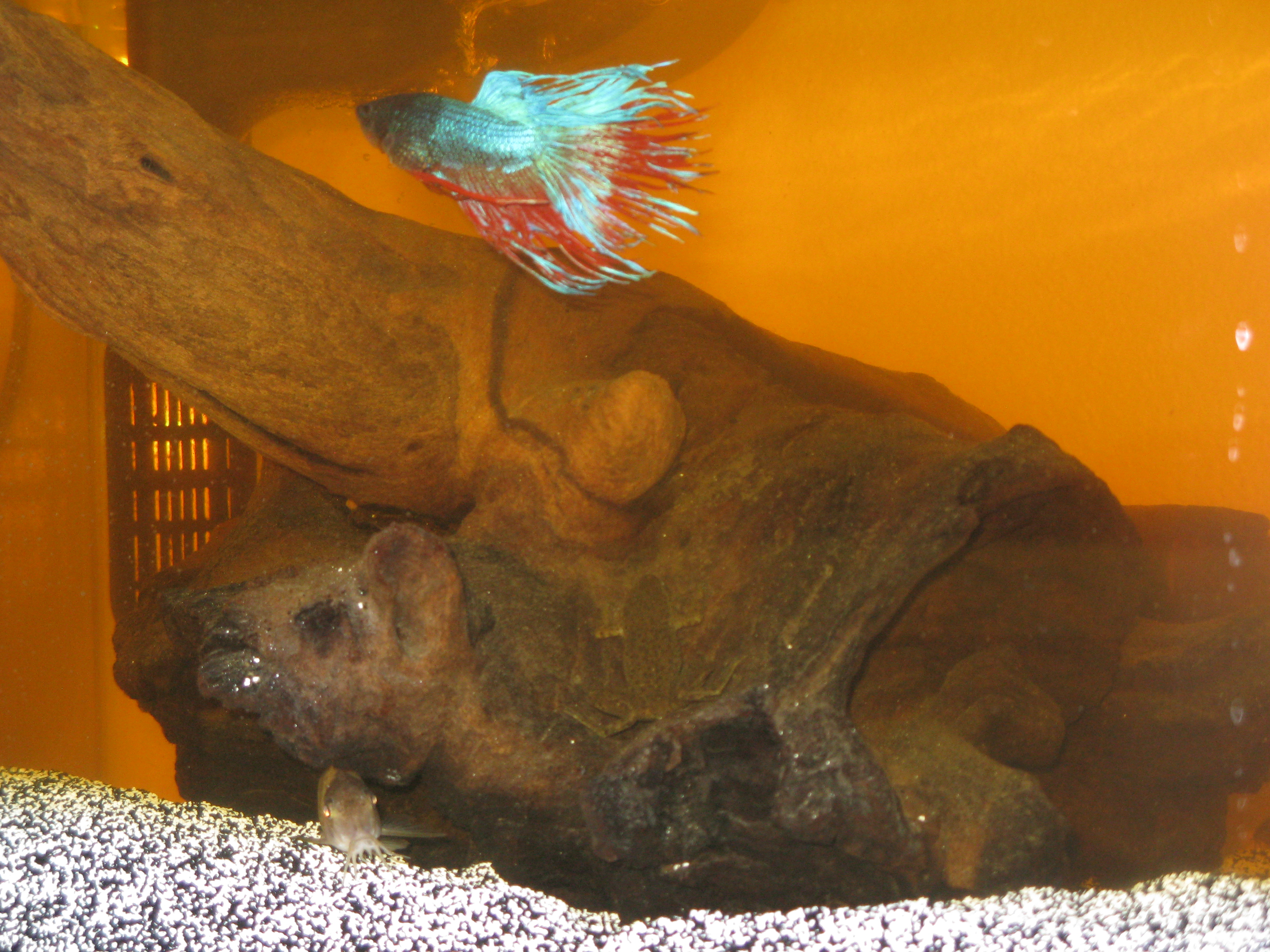
Bog-wood (similar to, but not, driftwood) in an aquarium, turning the water a tea-like brown

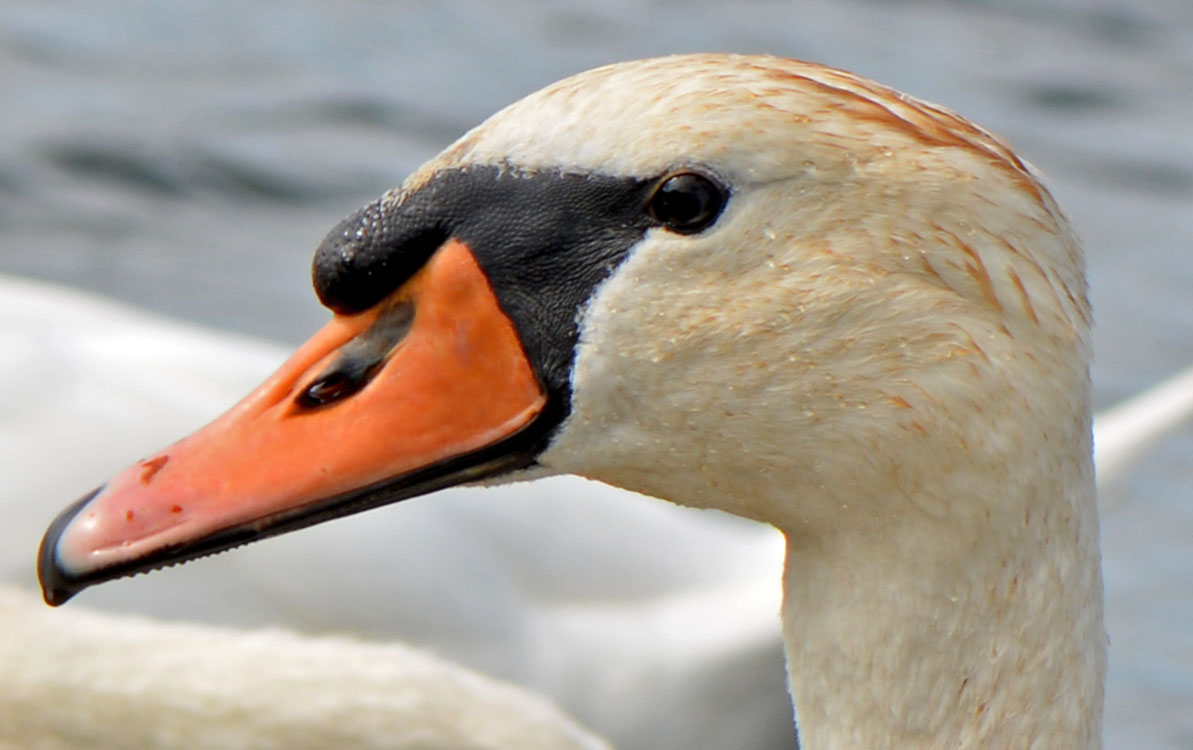
A mute swan with reddish-brown staining on the top of its head, caused by exposure to dissolved tannins and iron compounds in water

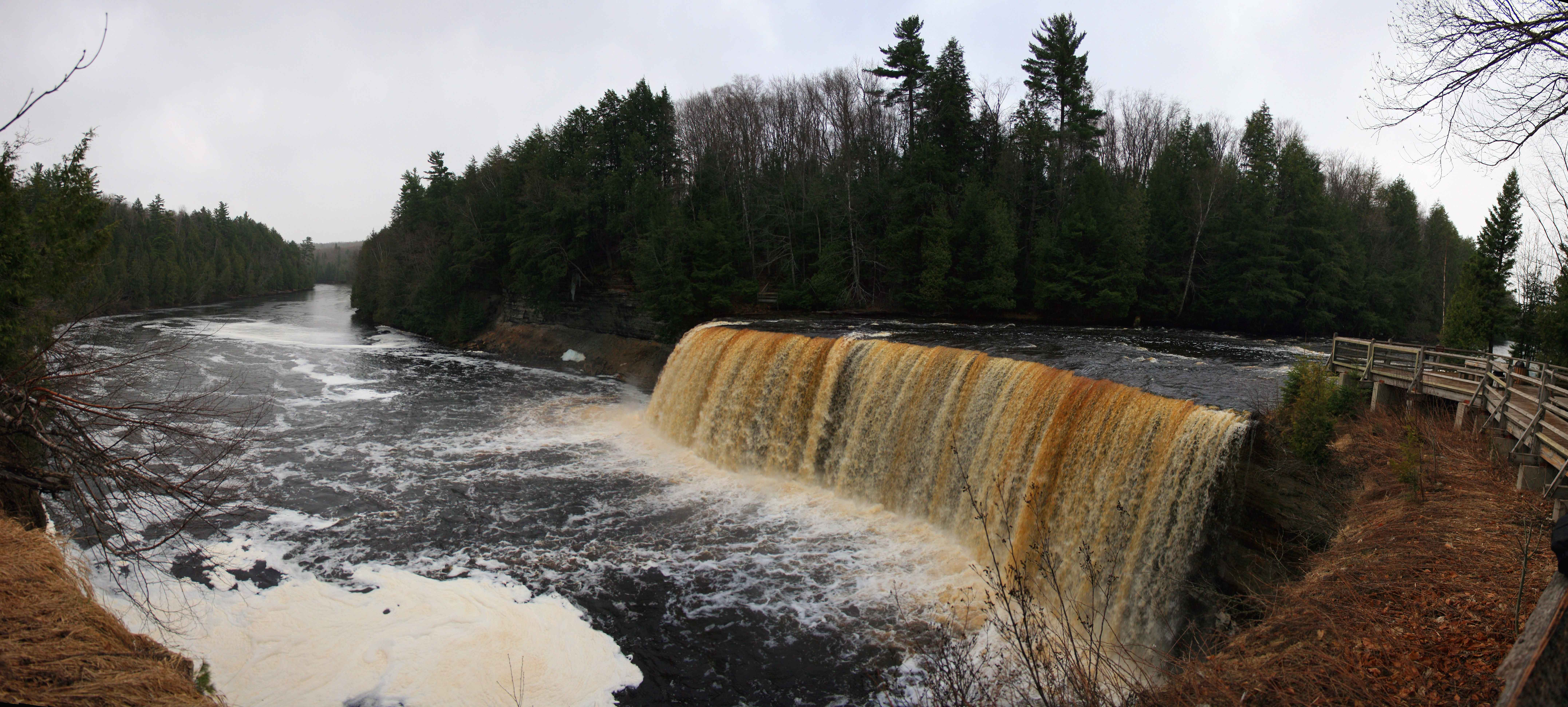
Upper Tahquamenon falls Panoramic view

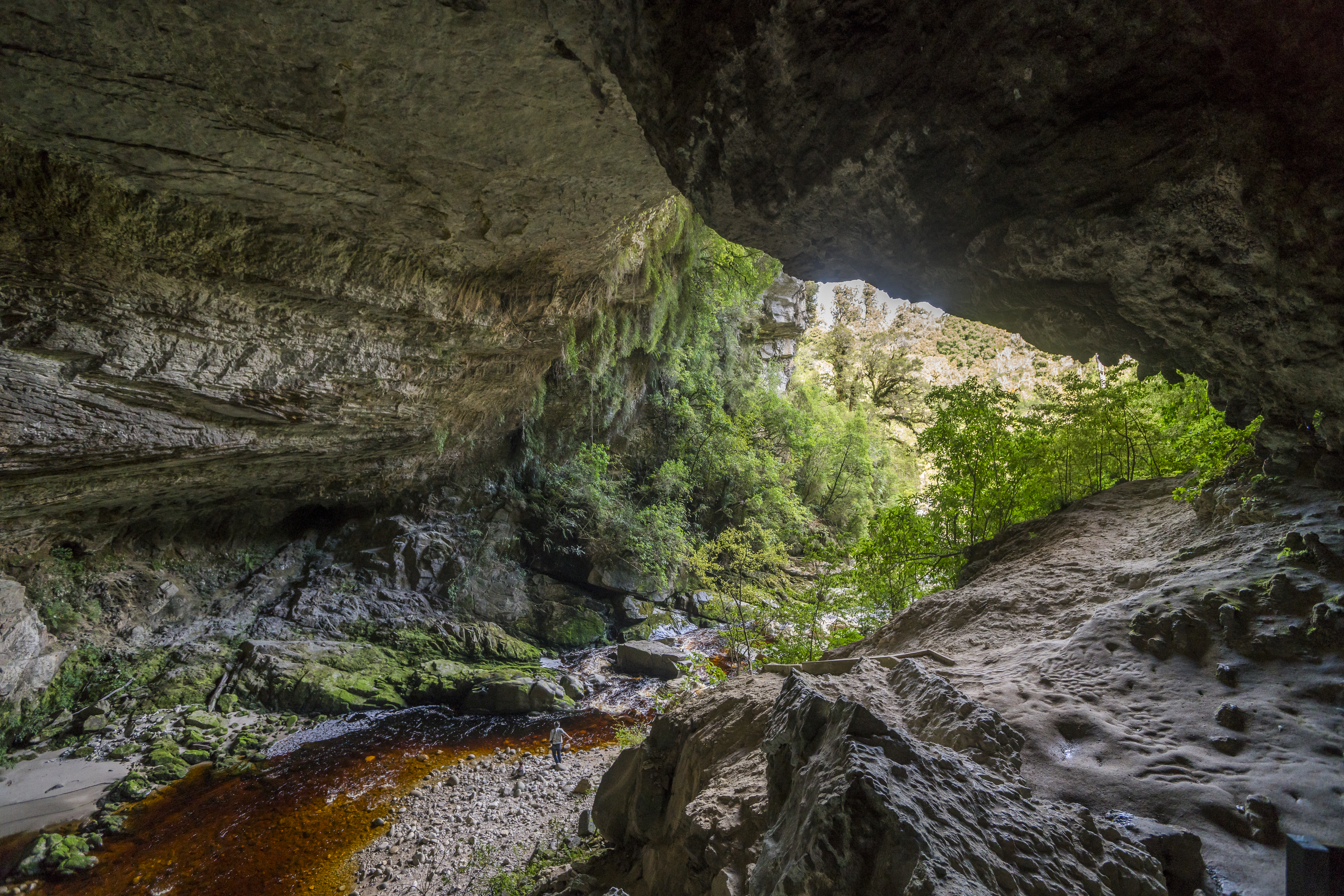
The tannin-rich Oparara River in the West Coast region of New Zealand

== Extraction ==
There is no single protocol for extracting tannins from all plant material. The procedures used for tannins are widely variable. It may be that acetone in the extraction solvent increases the total yield by inhibiting interactions between tannins and proteins during extraction or even by breaking hydrogen bonds between tannin-protein complexes.

== Tests for tannins ==
There are three groups of methods for the analysis of tannins: precipitation of proteins or alkaloids, reaction with phenolic rings, and depolymerization.

=== Alkaloid precipitation ===
Alkaloids such as caffeine, cinchonine, quinine or strychnine, precipitates polyphenols and tannins. This property can be used in a quantitation method.

=== Goldbeater's skin test ===
When goldbeater's skin or ox skin is dipped in HCl, rinsed in water, soaked in the tannin solution for 5 minutes, washed in water, and then treated with 1% FeSO_{4} solution, it gives a blue black color if tannin was present.

=== Ferric chloride test ===
The following describes the use of ferric chloride (FeCl_{3}) tests for phenolics in general: Powdered plant leaves of the test plant (1.0 g) are weighed into a beaker and 10 ml of distilled water are added. The mixture is boiled for five minutes. Two drops of 5% FeCl_{3} are then added. Production of a greenish precipitate is an indication of the presence of tannins. Alternatively, a portion of the water extract is diluted with distilled water in a ratio of 1:4 and few drops of 10% ferric chloride solution is added. A blue or green color indicates the presence of tannins (Evans, 1989).

=== Other methods ===
The hide-powder method is used in tannin analysis for leather tannin and the Stiasny method for wood adhesives. Statistical analysis reveals that there is no significant relationship between the results from the hide-powder and the Stiasny methods.

Hide-powder method

400 mg of sample tannins are dissolved in 100 ml of distilled water. 3 g of slightly chromated hide-powder previously dried in vacuum for 24 hours over CaCl_{2} are added and the mixture stirred for 1 hour at ambient temperature. The suspension is filtered without vacuum through a sintered glass filter. The weight gain of the hide-powder expressed as a percentage of the weight of the starting material is equated to the percentage of tannin in the sample.

Stiasny's method

100 mg of sample tannins are dissolved in 10 ml distilled water. 1 ml of 10 M HCl and 2 ml of 37% formaldehyde are added and the mixture heated under reflux for 30 minutes. The reaction mixture is filtered while hot through a sintered glass filter. The precipitate is washed with hot water (5 × 10 ml) and dried over CaCl_{2}. The yield of tannin is expressed as a percentage of the weight of the starting material.

=== Reaction with phenolic rings ===
The bark tannins of Commiphora angolensis have been revealed by the usual color and precipitation reactions and by quantitative determination by the methods of Löwenthal-Procter and of Deijs (formalin-hydrochloric acid method).

Colorimetric methods have existed such as the Neubauer-Löwenthal method which uses potassium permanganate as an oxidizing agent and indigo sulfate as an indicator, originally proposed by Löwenthal in 1877. The difficulty is that the establishing of a titer for tannin is not always convenient since it is extremely difficult to obtain the pure tannin. Neubauer proposed to remove this difficulty by establishing the titer not with regard to the tannin but with regard to crystallised oxalic acid, whereby he found that 83 g oxalic acid correspond to 41.20 g tannin. Löwenthal's method has been criticized. For instance, the amount of indigo used is not sufficient to retard noticeably the oxidation of the non-tannins substances. The results obtained by this method are therefore only comparative. A modified method, proposed in 1903 for the quantification of tannins in wine, Feldmann's method, is making use of calcium hypochlorite, instead of potassium permanganate, and indigo sulfate.

== Food items with tannins ==
=== Accessory fruits ===
Strawberries, an accessory fruit, contain both hydrolyzable and condensed tannins.

=== Berries ===
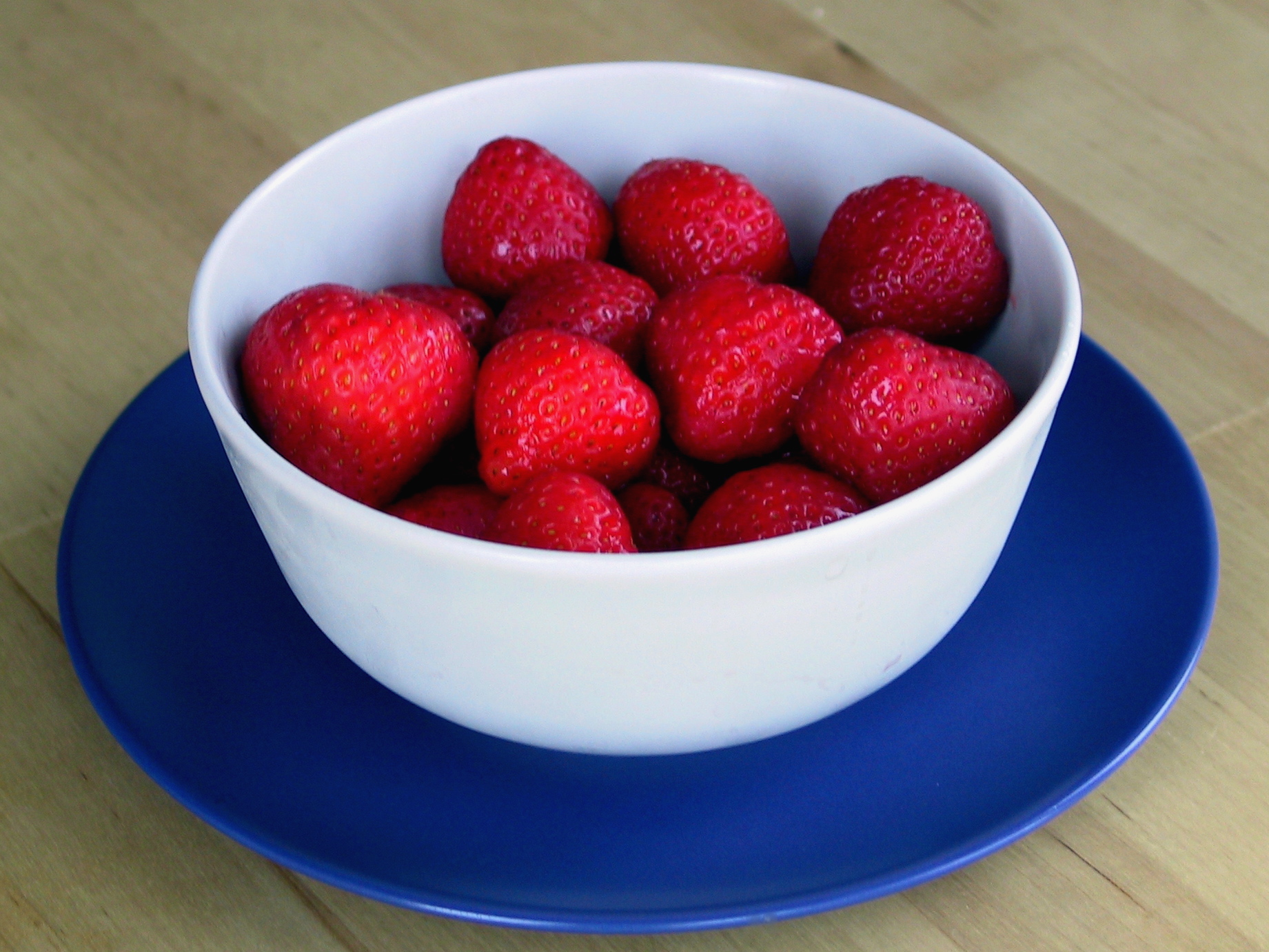
Strawberries in a bowl

Most berries, such as cranberries, and blueberries, contain both hydrolyzable and condensed tannins.

=== Nuts ===
Nuts vary in the amount of tannins they contain. Some species of acorns of oak contain large amounts. For example, acorns of Quercus robur and Quercus petraea in Poland were found to contain 2.4–5.2% and 2.6–4.8% tannins as a proportion of dry matter, but the tannins can be removed by leaching in water so that the acorns become edible. Other nuts – such as hazelnuts, walnuts, pecans, and almonds – contain lower amounts. Tannin concentration in the crude extract of these nuts did not directly translate to the same relationships for the condensed fraction.

=== Herbs and spices ===
Cloves, tarragon, cumin, thyme, vanilla, and cinnamon all contain tannins.

=== Legumes ===
Most legumes contain tannins. Red-colored beans contain the most tannins, and white-colored beans have the least. Peanuts without shells have a very low tannin content. Chickpeas (garbanzo beans) have a smaller amount of tannins.

=== Chocolate ===
Chocolate liquor contains about 6% tannins.

=== Drinks with tannins ===
Principal human dietary sources of tannins are tea and coffee. Most wines aged in charred oak barrels possess tannins absorbed from the wood. Soils high in clay also contribute to tannins in wine grapes. This concentration gives wine its signature astringency.

Coffee pulp has been found to contain low to trace amounts of tannins.

==== Fruit juices ====
Apple, grape and berry juices all contain high amounts of tannins. Sometimes tannins are even added to juices and ciders to create a more astringent feel to the taste.

==== Beer ====
In addition to the alpha acids extracted from hops to provide bitterness in beer, condensed tannins are also present. However, in some styles, the presence of this astringency is acceptable or even desired, as, for example, in a Flanders red ale.

In lager type beers, the tannins can form a precipitate with specific haze-forming proteins in the beer resulting in turbidity at low temperature. This chill haze can be prevented by removing part of the tannins or part of the haze-forming proteins. Tannins are removed using PVPP, haze-forming proteins by using silica or tannic acid.

== Properties for animal nutrition ==
Tannins have traditionally been considered antinutritional, depending upon their chemical structure and dosage.

Many studies suggest that chestnut tannins have positive effects on silage quality in the round bale silages, in particular reducing NPNs (non-protein nitrogen) in the lowest wilting level.

Improved fermentability of soya meal nitrogen in the rumen may occur. Condensed tannins inhibit herbivore digestion by binding to consumed plant proteins and making them more difficult for animals to digest, and by interfering with protein absorption and digestive enzymes (for more on that topic, see plant defense against herbivory). Histatins, another type of salivary proteins, also precipitate tannins from solution, thus preventing alimentary adsorption.

Legume fodders containing condensed tannins are a possible option for integrated sustainable control of gastrointestinal nematodes in ruminants, which may help address the worldwide development of resistance to synthetic anthelmintics. These include nuts, temperate and tropical barks, carob, coffee and cocoa.

== Tannin uses and market ==
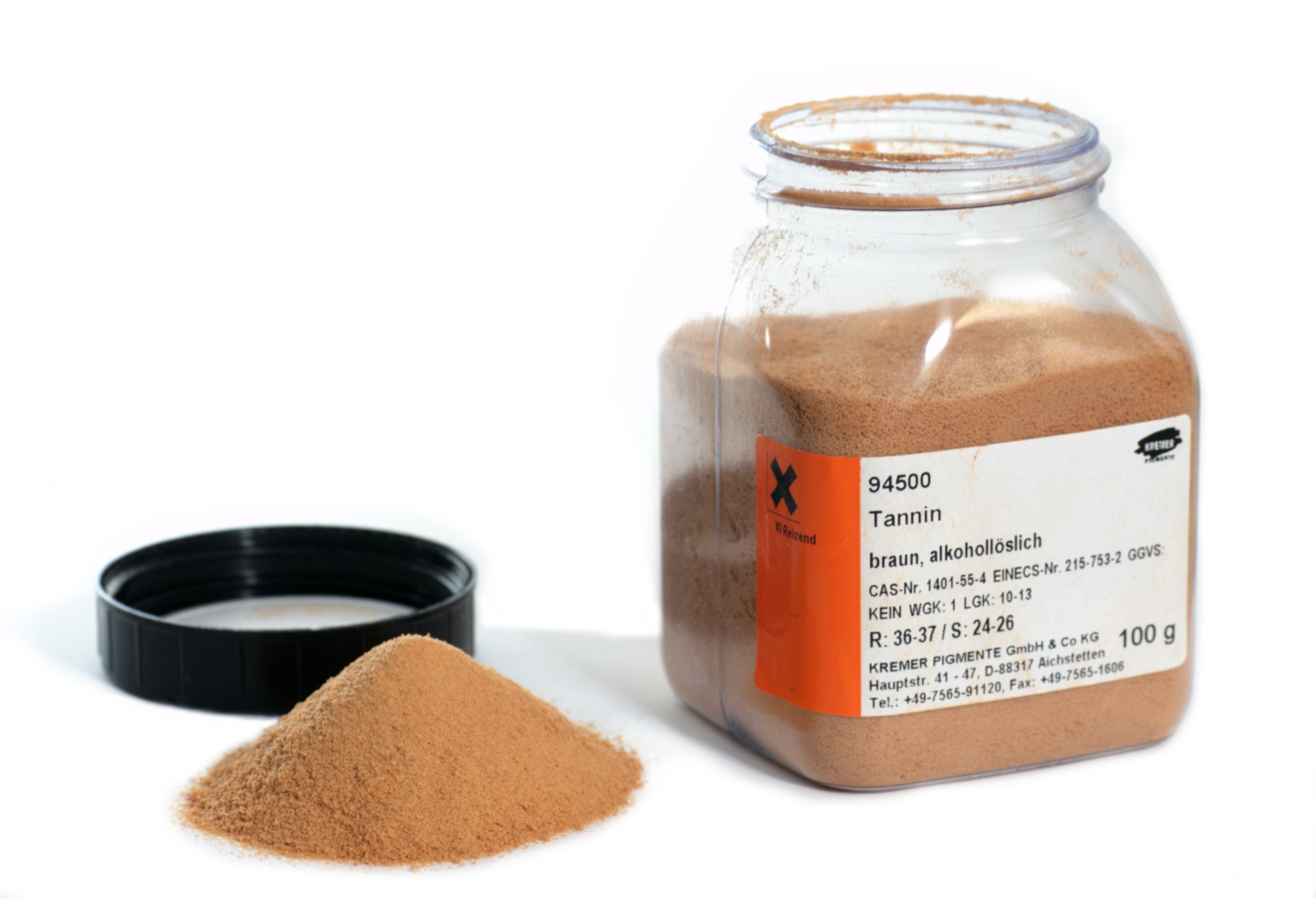
Tannin in a plastic container

Tannins have been used since antiquity in the processes of tanning hides for leather, and in helping preserve iron artifacts (as with Japanese iron teapots).

Industrial tannin production began at the beginning of the 19th century with the industrial revolution, to produce tanning material for the need for more leather. Before that time, processes used plant material and were long (up to six months).

There was a collapse in the vegetable tannin market in the 1950s–1960s, due to the appearance of synthetic tannins, which were invented in response to a scarcity of vegetable tannins during World War II. At that time, many small tannin industry sites closed.

The cost of the final product depends on the method used to extract the tannins, in particular the use of solvents, alkali and other chemicals used (for instance glycerin). For large quantities, the most cost-effective method is hot water extraction.

Food-grade tannic acid is used as a clarifying agent and flavor ingredient in beverage manufacturing.

=== Uses ===
Tannins are an important ingredient in the process of tanning leather. Tanbark from oak, mimosa, chestnut and quebracho tree has traditionally been the primary source of tannery tannin, though inorganic tanning agents are also in use today and account for 90% of the world's leather production.

Tannins produce different colors with ferric chloride (either blue, blue black, or green to greenish-black) according to the type of tannin. Iron gall ink is produced by treating a solution of tannins with iron(II) sulfate.

Tannins can also be used as a mordant, and are especially useful in natural dyeing of cellulose fibers such as cotton. The type of tannin used may or may not have an impact on the final color of the fiber.

Tannin is a component in a type of industrial particleboard adhesive developed jointly by the Tanzania Industrial Research and Development Organization and Forintek Labs Canada. Pinus radiata tannins has been investigated for the production of wood adhesives.

Tannins can be used for production of anti-corrosive primers for treating rusted steel surfaces prior to painting, converting rust to iron tannate and consolidating and sealing the surface.

The use of resins made of tannins has been investigated to remove mercury and methylmercury from solution. Immobilized tannins have been tested to recover uranium from seawater.
