= Jeffrey Harborne =

British chemist (1928–2002)

Jeffrey B. Harborne

Jeffrey Barry Harborne FRS (1 September 1928, in Bristol – 21 July 2002) was a British chemist who specialised in phytochemistry. He was Professor of Botany at the University of Reading, 1976–93, then Professor emeritus. He contributed to more than 40 books and 270 research papers and was a pioneer in ecological biochemistry, particularly in the complex chemical interactions between plants, microbes and insects.

== Education ==
Harborne was educated at Wycliffe College, Stonehouse, Gloucestershire and the University of Bristol, where he graduated in chemistry in 1949. He earned a PhD in 1953 with a thesis on the naturally occurring oxygen heterocyclic compounds with Wilson Baker (1900–2002).

== Research ==
Between 1953 and 1955, he worked as a postdoc with Professor Theodore Albert Geissman at the University of California, Los Angeles, studying phenolic plant pigments, including anthocyanins. The identification of these substances, he made use of ultraviolet-visible spectroscopy.

After his return to the UK, he joined the Potato Genetics group at the John Innes Research Institute, then located at Bayfordbury. Here he worked with K.S. Dodds on the phenolics of Solanum species, extending his knowledge of anthocyanins. This work grew to encompass a wide range of mostly garden plants. In addition to discovering novel anthocyanidins, he made in-depth studies of their glycosylation and began work on their acylation. During this time he forged links with E. C. Bate-Smith and Tony Swain at Cambridge, Swain arranging for him to edit his first book, The biochemistry of phenolic compounds. His time at the John Innes ended when the Potato Genetics group was wound up, and the institution itself moved to Norwich.

Between 1965 and 1968, Harborne worked as a research assistant at the University of Liverpool. After this, he was Reader in the Department of Botany, the University of Reading, England. In 1976 he became Professor in the Department of Botany, the University of Reading. Between 1987 and 1993, he was head of the Department of Botany at the University of Reading. In 1993, he retired. He had during his tenure at the University of Reading also positions as visiting professor at the University Federal do Rio de Janeiro (1973), the University of Texas at Austin (1976), the University of California at Santa Barbara (1977) and the University of Illinois at Urbana-Champaign (1981).

Harborne investigated the role of flavonoids in interactions between plants and insects. He also investigated the relationship between anthocyanins and the ecology of pollination. He also studied the role of phytoalexins in members of the bean family (Fabaceae), the rose family (Rosaceae) and the carrot family (Apiaceae). He published on chemotaxonomy as in his research articles on the genetic control of expression of anthocyanins, flavones and aurones in the primrose family (Primulaceae) in snapdragons (Antirrhinum) and a number of other plants. He also published on isoflavones and chemical ecology.

In his book, Phytochemicals Methods: A Guide to Modern Techniques of Plant Analysis, Harborne described a number of analytical methods in plant chemistry that he developed for the system of distribution of anthocyanins in major plant groups. In Comparative Biochemistry of the Flavonoids he described the biochemistry of flavonoids in various plant groups. In the scientific journal Natural Product Reports he wrote a series of review articles about the discovery of anthocyanins and other flavonoids. In his book Introduction to Ecological Biochemistry he described the ecological role of natural substances. The publication of this book is seen as the starting point of the study of environmental chemistry. Developments in the chemical ecology he described in a series of review articles in Natural Product Reports. He was author or co-author of about 270 research and review articles. He was also author or editor of some forty books.

From 1972 Harborne was the Executive Editor of the journal Phytochemistry. Between 1986 and 1999 he was chief editor of this journal. He was the founder of the magazine Analysis Phytochemicals and he was editor of Methods in Plant Biochemistry.

Harborne received a number of awards during his lifetime. In 1985 he received the Linnean Medal from the Linnean Society of London for his services to botany. He also received medals from the Phytochemical Society of Europe (PSE Medal) (1986) and the International Society of Chemical Ecology (1993). In 1993 he was awarded the Pergamon Phytochemistry Prize. In 1995, he was elected a Fellow of the Royal Society. In 2010, the University of Reading's Plant Science Laboratories, where he was Professor, were named the Harborne Building in his honour.

=== Publications ===
- Biochemistry of Phenolic Compounds, 1964
- Comparative Biochemistry of the Flavonoids, 1967
- Phytochemical Phylogeny, 1970
- Phytochemical Ecology, 1972
- Phytochemical Methods, 1973, 3rd edn 1998
- Introduction to Ecological Biochemistry, 1977, 4th edn 1993
- Phytochemical Aspects of Plant and Animal Coevolution, 1978
- Plant Chemosystematics, 1984
- The Flavonoids: advances in research since 1986, 1994
- The Handbook of Natural Flavonoids, vol 1 and 2, 1999
- Phytochemical Dictionary, 1993, 2nd edn 1999
- Dictionary of Plant Toxins, 1996
- The Handbook of Flavonoid Pigments, 1999
- The Handbook of Natural Flavonoids, 1999
- Chemical Dictionary of Economic Plants, 2001

== Career ==
- Biochemist, the John Innes Institute, 1955–65
- Research Fellow, University of Liverpool, 1965–68
- Reader, the University of Reading, UK, 1968–76
- Professor, Dept. of Botany, the University of Reading, UK, 1976–93
- Visiting professor, University of Texas at Austin, 1976
- Visiting professor, University of California, 1977

He was editor-in-chief of the journal Phytochemistry, 1972–98.

=== Honours ===
- Fellow of the Royal Society of Chemistry, 1956
- Fellow of the Biochemical Society, 1957
- Plenary Lecturer, IUPAC Natural Products Symposium, 1976
- Gold Medal in Botany, Linnean Society, 1985
- Fellow of the Linnean Society, 1986
- Silver Medal, Phytochemical Society of Europe, 1986
- Silver Medal, International Society of Chemical Ecology, 1993
- Fellow of the Institute of Biology, 1994
- Fellow of the Royal Society, 1995

== Personal life ==
He was married with 2 sons and was churchwarden at Christchurch Reading for many years. His niece, Katharine Harborne, studied Horticultural Botany at the University of Reading from 1979 to 1981 and became a plant pathologist researching the epidemiology of Sugarcane Mosaic Virus for the South African Sugar Association at Mount Edgecombe.
