= Leucoanthocyanidin =

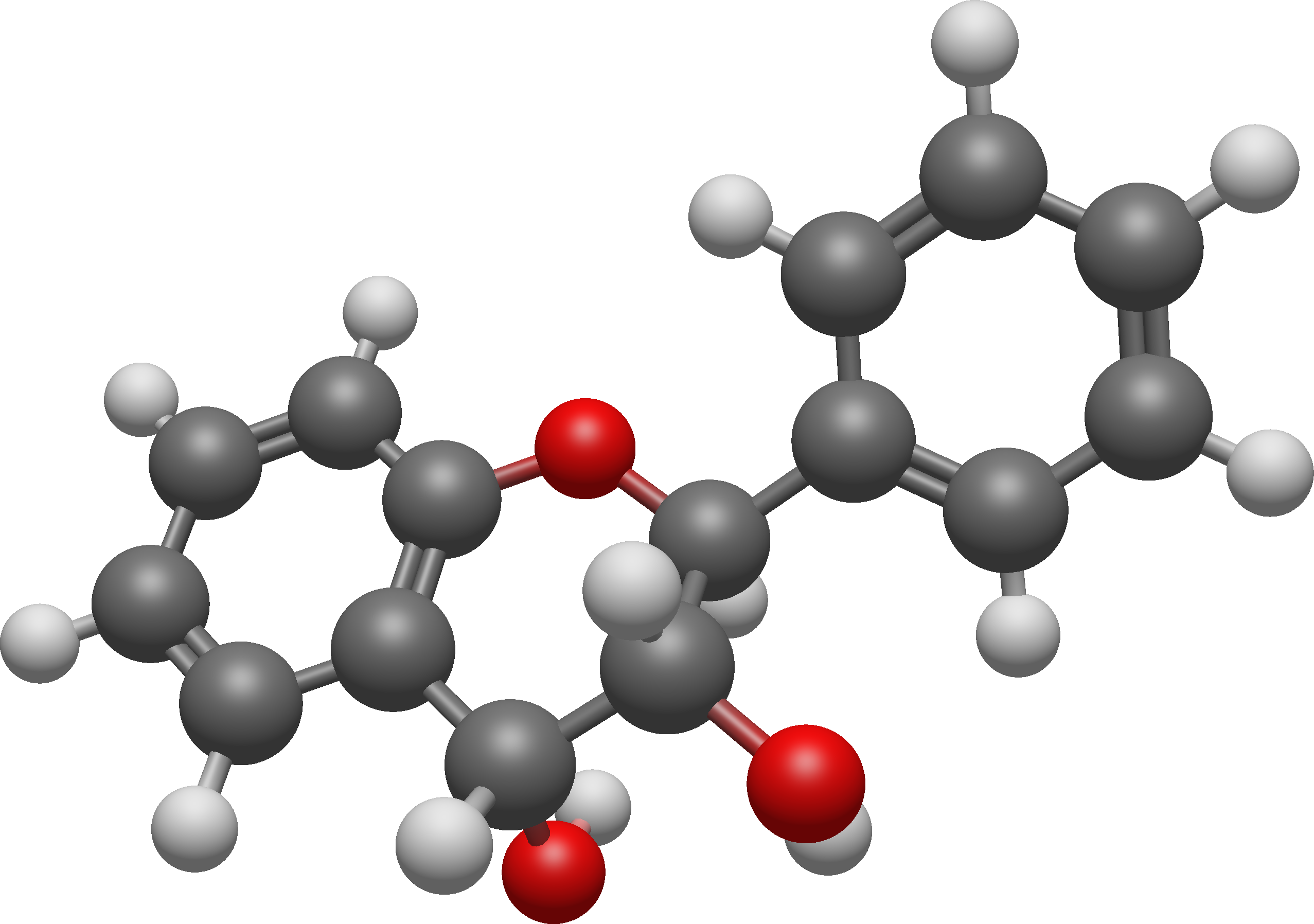

Names
- IUPAC name Flavan-3,4-diol
- Systematic IUPAC name 2-Phenyl-3,4-dihydro-2H-1-benzopyran-3,4-diol

Identifiers
| CAS Number | 5023-02-9 |
| 3D model (JSmol) | Interactive image |
| ChemSpider | 4477408 |
| PubChem CID | 5318979 |
| UNII | EH726HE44D |
- InChI: InChI=1S/C15H14O3/c16-13-11-8-4-5-9-12(11)18-15(14(13)17)10-6-2-1-3-7-10/h1-9,13-17H Key: XIMADJWJJOMVID-UHFFFAOYSA-N
- SMILES: C1=CC=C(C=C1)C2C(C(C3=CC=CC=C3O2)O)O

Properties
| Chemical formula | C_{15}H_{14}O_{3} |
| Molar mass | 242.274 g·mol^{−1} |
- Except where otherwise noted, data are given for materials in their standard state (at 25 °C [77 °F], 100 kPa). verify (what is ?) Infobox references

Leucoanthocyanidin (flavan-3,4-diol) is the parent structure of a class of colorless chemical compounds related to anthocyanidins and anthocyanins. Leucoanthocyanins can be found in Anadenanthera peregrina and in several species of Nepenthes including N. burbidgeae, N. muluensis, N. rajah, N. tentaculata, and N. × alisaputrana.

Compound in this class include:

- Leucocyanidin
- Leucodelphinidin
- Leucofisetinidin
- Leucomalvidin
- Leucopelargonidin
- Leucopeonidin
- Leucorobinetinidin
- Melacacidin
- Teracacidin from Acacia obtusifolia and Acacia maidenii heartwoods

Leucoanthocyanidins have been demonstrated to be intermediates in anthocyanidin biosynthesis in flowers of Matthiola incana.

Edgar Charles Bate-Smith recommended in 1954 the use of the Forestal solvent for the isolation of leuco-anthocyanins.

The leucoanthocyanins were discovered simultaneously by Gertrude Maud Robinson and Robert Robinson and by Otto Rosenheim. Rosenheim coined the term.

== Metabolism ==
Leucoanthocyanidin dioxygenase uses flavan-3,4-diols to produce 3-hydroxyanthocyanidins. The gene encoding the enzyme (PpLDOX) has been identified in peach and expression has been studied in Vitis vinifera.Gollop, Rachel; Farhi, Sharon; Perl, Avihai (2001). "Regulation of the leucoanthocyanidin dioxygenase gene expression in Vitis vinifera". Plant Science. 161 (3): 579–588. doi:10.1016/S0168-9452(01)00445-9.
