= Biochemical Systematics and Ecology =

Scientific journal

- Discipline: Chemotaxonomy, ecology
- Language: English
- Edited by: S. Pacifico & C. Zidorn

Publication details
- Former name(s): Biochemical Systematics
- History: 1973-present
- Publisher: Elsevier
- Frequency: Bimonthly
- Impact factor: 1.462 (2021)

Standard abbreviations
- ISO 4: Biochem. Syst. Ecol.

Indexing
- ISSN: 0305-1978
- LCCN: 74646940
- OCLC no.: 749932696

Links
- Journal homepage; Online archive

Biochemical Systematics and Ecology is a peer-reviewed scientific journal covering chemotaxonomy and ecology. Tony Swain, one of the first editors of Phytochemistry started the sister journal Biochemical Systematics in 1973. It was renamed Biochemical Systematics and Ecology in the next year. The editors-in-chief are Severina Pacifico (Università degli Studi della Campania Luigi Vanvitelli) and Christian Zidorn (Kiel University).
