= Edwin Haslam =

British chemist

Edwin Haslam (1932 – 3 October 2013) was an organic chemist and an author of books on polyphenols. He was an alumnus of Sir John Deane's College in Northwich, Cheshire, United Kingdom and was for many years Professor of Organic Chemistry at the University of Sheffield.

Haslam proposed a first comprehensive definition of plant polyphenols based on the earlier proposals of Edgar Charles Bate-Smith, Tony Swain and Theodore White, which includes specific structural characteristics common to all phenolics having a tanning property. It is referred to as the White–Bate-Smith–Swain–Haslam (WBSSH) definition.

== Works ==
- Chemistry of vegetable tannins, 1 edition – first published in 1966
- The shikimate pathway, 2 editions – first published in 1974
- Metabolites and metabolism, 1 edition – first published in 1985
- Plant polyphenols: vegetable tannins revisited, 1 edition – first published in 1989 ISBN 0-521-32189-1
- Shikimic acid, 1 edition – first published in 1993
- Practical Polyphenolics, 2 editions – first published in 1998, ISBN 978-0-521-46513-7
