= Tony Swain (chemist) =

American chemist (1922–1987)

Tony Swain (1922–1987) was a chemist known for his definition of a plant polyphenol with Bate-Smith, Haslam and Theodore White, which includes specific structural characteristics common to all phenolics having a tanning property. It is referred to as the White–Bate-Smith–Swain–Haslam (WBSSH) definition.

The discovery in 1943 by Martin and Synge of paper chromatography provided for the first time the means of surveying the phenolic constituents of plants and for their separation and identification. There was an explosion of activity in this field after 1945, none more so than that of Bate-Smith and Tony Swain. He worked with Edgar C. Bate-Smith at Cambridge University.

Tony Swain was one of the first editors of Phytochemistry with Jeffrey Harborne. He started the sister journal Biochemical Systematics in 1973, renamed Biochemical Systematics and Ecology in the next year.

Swain received his Bachelor of Science from the University of London. Here he also obtained a doctorate in organic chemistry. Afterwards he was still active at the University of Exeter. He then went on to work at the Low Temperature Research Station, a department of the University of Cambridge. Here he was involved in research into biosynthesis, enzymology and tissue culture. He also studied tannins and especially their quantitative estimates.

The Plant Phenolics Group was founded in Cambridge in 1957 by, among others, Swain, Jeffrey Harborne, EC Bate-smith and Eric Conn. Swain became the first secretary of this informal group of people interested in plant phenols. People from all over Europe joined the organization. After a number of name changes, it was decided in 1977 to rename the organization the Phytochemical Society of Europe, the name by which the organization is still known today. Swain co-founded Phytochemistry in 1961 with Robert Maxwell and Gilbert Richards, which today serves as the scientific journal of the Phytochemical Society of Europe and the Phytochemical Society of North America.. For the first ten years, Swain was the editor of the magazine.

In 1963 Chemical Plant Taxonomy was published, the first book to focus on chemotaxonomy. Of these, Swain was the editor. As a result of his efforts, a committee was formed by the IUPAC to deal with chemotaxonomy. In 1973, together with Ernest Schoffeniels, he founded the journal Biochemical Systematics for this field. The title was later changed to Biochemical Systematics and Ecology, after it was decided to also cover chemical ecology in this journal.

Between 1965 and 1968, Swain served as a scientific adviser in the Cabinet Office, part of the British government. This position was offered to him by Solly Zuckermann. Swain subsequently spent two years at Harvard and Yale. On his return to England he set up a biochemical laboratory at the Kew Gardens. Here he focused on the functions of plant phenols.

Between 1975 and 1987 Swain was professor of plant biochemistry at Boston University. Between 1976 and 1979 he was chairman of the biology department. Here he was engaged in research into chemical ecology and the evolutionary biology of interactions between plants and animals. In the spring of 1987 he went to retirement. After this he returned to the Royal Botanic Gardens, Kew, London England; where he was involved with metabolites of micro-organisms in the period before his death.

In 1979, along with Lynn Margulis, Swain co- founded the Planetary Biology Internship, which allows advanced students to participate in NASA biological research. Swain was involved in this educational program as a teacher.

Swain died as a result of injuries sustained in a car accident. Lynn Margulis, Clifford Matthews and Aaron Haselton co- dedicated the book Environmental Evolution to him. Robert Hegnauer dedicated part eight of Chemotaxonomy der Pflanzen to him. A song from Phyochemistry (volume 27, number 12, 1988) was also dedicated to him.

== Works ==
- Chemical plant taxonomy, 1963
- Plants in the Development of Modern Medicine, Harvard University Press; First U.S. Edition, 1972
- Chemistry in Evolution & Systematics: Plenary Lectures Presented at the International Symposium, Butterworths, 1973
- Secondary Compounds as Protective Agents - Annual Review of Plant Physiology, Vol. 28, pages 479-501, 1977, doi:10.1146/annurev.pp.28.060177.002403
- Biochemistry of Plant Phenolics, Plenum Publishing Corporation, 1979 ISBN 0306400286
