= Melacacidin =

Names
- IUPAC name (2R,3R,4R)-Flavan-3,3′,4,4′,7,8-hexol
- Systematic IUPAC name (2R,3R,4R)-2-(3,4-Dihydroxyphenyl)-3,4-dihydro-2H-1-benzopyran-3,4,7,8-tetrol

Identifiers
CAS Number	38081-16-2
3D model (JSmol)	Interactive image
ChemSpider	148659
PubChem CID	169996
UNII	M23MQJ2D23
CompTox Dashboard (EPA)	DTXSID60959025
- InChI: InChI=1S/C15H14O7/c16-8-3-1-6(5-10(8)18)14-13(21)11(19)7-2-4-9(17)12(20)15(7)22-14/h1-5,11,13-14,16-21H/t11-,13-,14-/m1/s1 Key: JEUXGAUBSWADEA-MRVWCRGKSA-N; InChI=1/C15H14O7/c16-8-3-1-6(5-10(8)18)14-13(21)11(19)7-2-4-9(17)12(20)15(7)22-14/h1-5,11,13-14,16-21H/t11-,13-,14-/m1/s1 Key: JEUXGAUBSWADEA-MRVWCRGKBR
- SMILES: Oc1ccc(cc1O)[C@H]3Oc2c(O)c(O)ccc2[C@@H](O)[C@H]3O

Properties
Chemical formula	C_{15}H_{14}O_{7}
Molar mass	306.26 g/mol
- Except where otherwise noted, data are given for materials in their standard state (at 25 °C [77 °F], 100 kPa). verify (what is ?) Infobox references

Melacacidin is a chemical compound related to leucoanthocyanidins. It can be found in Acacia crassicarpa.

Melacacidin is a compound that can provoke contact allergy to Australian blackwood Acacia melanoxylon.
