= Leucopeonidin =

Names
- IUPAC name 2-(4-Hydroxy-3-methoxyphenyl)chromenylium-3,5,7-triol

Identifiers
CAS Number	20408-92-8
3D model (JSmol)	Interactive image
ChemSpider	57438550
PubChem CID	57459454
UNII	BF266A7TGU
CompTox Dashboard (EPA)	DTXSID50726667
- InChI: InChI=1S/C16H18O7/c1-22-11-4-7(2-3-9(11)18)16-15(21)14(20)13-10(19)5-8(17)6-12(13)23-16/h2-6,12-21H,1H3 Key: ZZNPEGJLMUWYNN-UHFFFAOYSA-N
- SMILES: OC1C(O)C2C(C=C(O)C=C2O)OC1c(cc3OC)ccc3O

Properties
Chemical formula	C_{16}H_{18}O_{7}
Molar mass	322.313 g·mol^{−1}
- Except where otherwise noted, data are given for materials in their standard state (at 25 °C [77 °F], 100 kPa). verify (what is ?) Infobox references

Leucopeonidin is a leucoanthocyanidin.

A leucopeonidin glycoside is found in the bark of Ficus bengalensis.
