= Pig Hill (Mount Kinabalu) =

Mountain in Sabah

Coordinates: 6°01′N 116°36′E

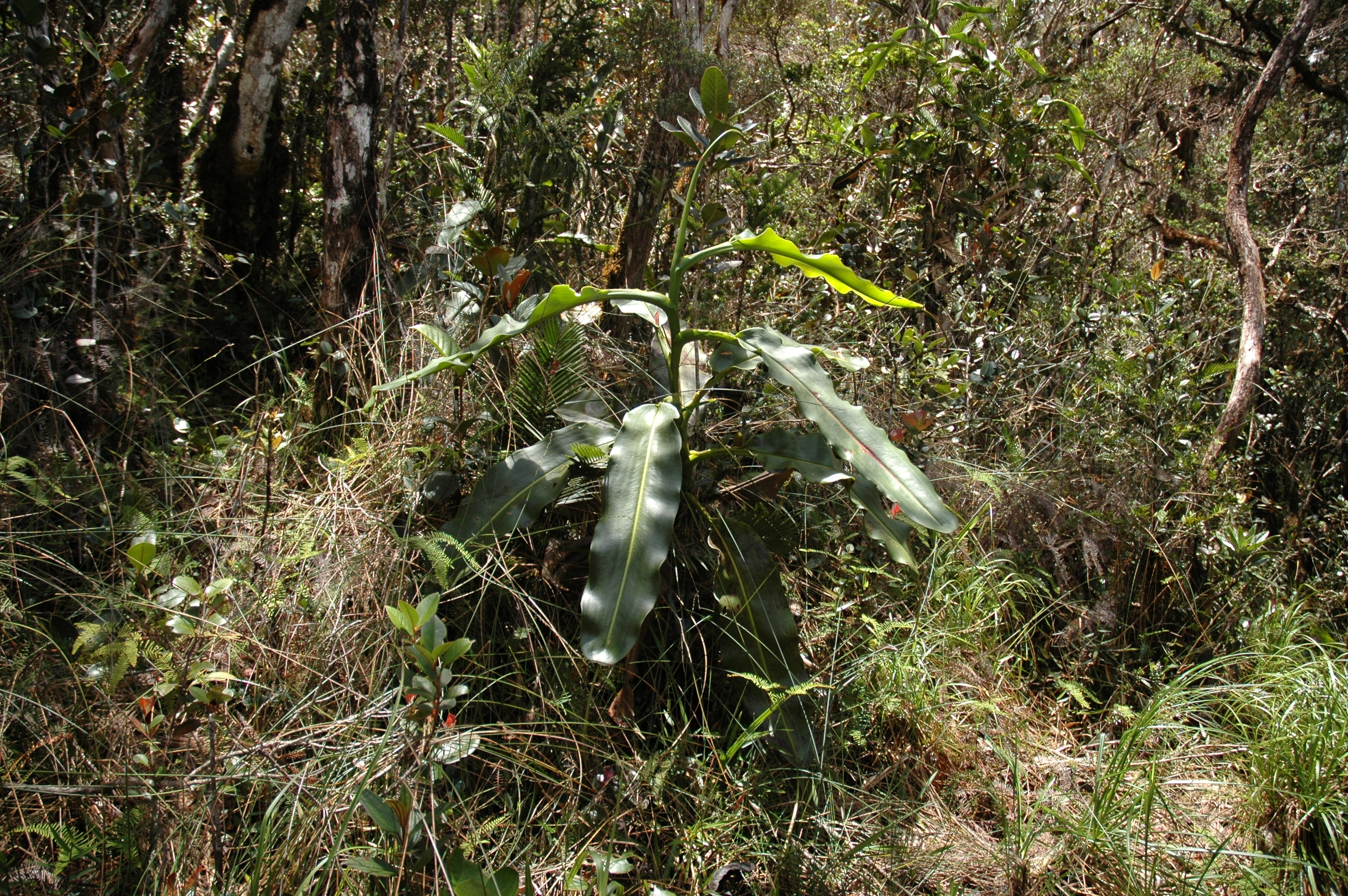
Nepenthes rajah growing in montane grassland on Pig Hill

Pig Hill is an ultramafic area situated at approximately 2000 m above sea level on the southeastern side of Mount Kinabalu in Kinabalu National Park, Sabah, Malaysian Borneo. It is located to the east of Mesilau, some 4 hours' walk from the Mesilau Nature Resort. A number of pitcher plant species are found on Pig Hill, including N. burbidgeae (1900–1950 m), N. rajah (1950–2320 m), and the natural hybrid between the two, N. × alisaputrana (1930–1950 m). Nepenthes tentaculata has also been recorded from Pig Hill. The local fauna includes the stick insect Dajaca chani.
