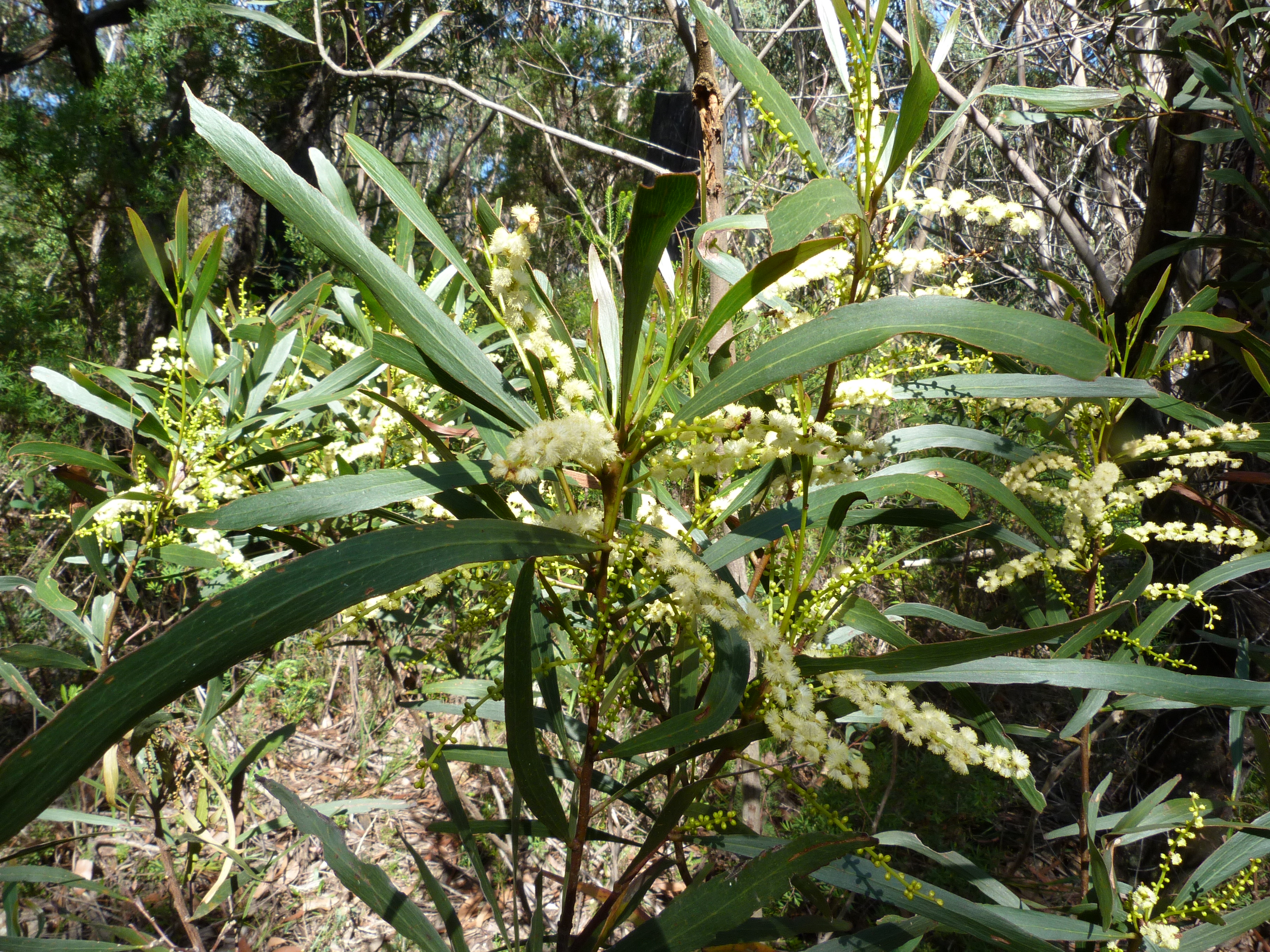

Scientific classification
- Kingdom: Plantae
- Clade: Tracheophytes
- Clade: Angiosperms
- Clade: Eudicots
- Clade: Rosids
- Order: Fabales
- Family: Fabaceae
- Subfamily: Caesalpinioideae
- Clade: Mimosoid clade
- Genus: Acacia
- Species: A. obtusifolia

Binomial name
- Acacia obtusifolia A.Cunn.
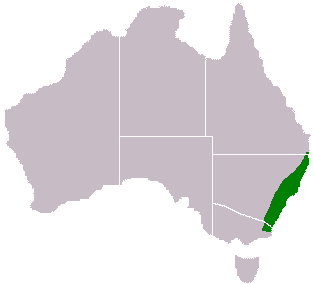
- Range of Acacia obtusifolia

Synonyms
- Acacia intertexta Sieber ex DC.; cacia longifolia f. elongata Benth.; Acacia longifolia f. latifolia Benth.; Acacia longifolia subvar. obtusifolia (A.Cunn.) Domin; Acacia longifolia var. obtusifolia (A.Cunn.) Benth. ex Seem.; Racosperma obtusifolium (A.Cunn.) Pedley

= Acacia obtusifolia =

Stiff leaf wattle

Species of legume

Acacia obtusifolia, commonly known as blunt-leaf wattle or stiff-leaf wattle, is a species of flowering plant in the family Fabaceae, and is endemic to south-eastern mainland Australia. It is an erect or spreading shrub with smooth, corrugated grey bark and glabrous branchlets angled towards the end. Its phyllodes are narrowly elliptic to more or less linear, the flowers creamy-white to pale yellow borne in spikes, and linear, almost cylindrical, crusty pods.

== Description ==
Acacia obtusifolia is a erect or spreading tree that typically grows to a height of 1.5–8 m (4 ft 11 in – 26 ft 3 in), sometimes to 15 m (49 ft) with smooth or corrugated grey bark on the trunk and glabrous branchlets that are angled near the end. Its phyllodes are narrowly elliptic to more or less linear, 120–250 mm (4.7–9.8 in) long, 7–3 mm (0.28–0.12 in) wide, leathery, dark green with granular resin globules on the edges. There are usually two to five prominent primary veins, and a gland about 8 mm (0.31 in) above the pulvinus and triangular stipules less than 0.5 mm (0.020 in) long at the base of the phyllodes. The flowers are creamy white to pale yellow and borne in spikes 30–70 mm (1.2–2.8 in) long on peduncles 5–10 mm (0.20–0.39 in) long. Flowering usually occurs from December to February, and the pods are more or less straight and subterete, 60–145 mm (2.4–5.7 in) long, 3–5 mm (0.12–0.20 in) wide and crusty to slightly woody. The seeds are narrowly elliptic, 4.5–6 mm (0.18–0.24 in) long and shiny with a top-shaped aril.

== Taxonomy ==
Acacia obtusifolia was first formally described in 1825 by Allan Cunningham in Barron Field's Geographical Memoirs on New South Wales. The specific epithet (obtusifolia), refers to the obtuse apex of the phyllodes.

== Distribution and habitat ==
Blunt-leaf wattle grows in forests and woodland, often near the edges of rainforest, and is widespread along the coastal and near-coastal ranges of south-eastern Australia from far south-eastern Queensland and north-eastern New South Wales, the central tablelands and southern coasts of New South Wales, and far eastern Victoria.

== Ecology ==
This species of wattle only rarely produces fruit, and appears to propagate mainly by forming suckers.

== Phytochemicals ==
Teracacidin, a flavan-3,4-diol, can be isolated from A. obtusifolia heartwood.

It was found to contain tryptamines by an underground researcher in 1992. Despite the lack of formal scientific publishing of its phytochemistry, several chromatographs show 0.3% alkaloid consisting of 2:1 N-Methyltryptamine, dimethyltryptamine (DMT), plus trace betacarbolines, while another found gramine. It is highly variable in composition, sometimes devoid of tryptamines. There have also been findings of 5-MeO-DMT, DMT and bufotenine. Some internet sources claim a 0.45% average dimethyltryptamine in the bark and 0.3% in the dried young leaves. Similarly, late 90s internet researchers have figures ranging from 0.4% to 0.5% in the dried material, noting there to be some variability.

There is evidence now that population numbers of mature trees have been greatly reduced due to ecological damage by people seeking tryptamines, which has become a threat to the species.
