= Lamri Ali =

Director of Sabah Parks

Datuk Lamri Ali is a former director of Sabah Parks. At the December 1999 World Conservation Union (IUCN)'s regional meeting staged in Pakse, Laos, Ali was awarded the WCPA-IUCN Fred M. Packard Award. The award recognises his contribution to nature conservation and protected area movement in Malaysia. Datuk Lamri is the only Malaysian recipient of this award.

Nepenthes × alisaputrana, a hybrid of two well-known Bornean pitcher plant species, is named in his honour.
