= Edgar Charles Bate-Smith =

English chemist and phytochemist

Edgar Charles Bate-Smith CBE (24 August 1900–8 May 1989) was an English chemist and phytochemist specialising in food chemistry. He worked in the Low Temperature Research Station in Cambridge where his main fields of research were meat and polyphenols.

The discovery in 1943 by Martin and Synge of paper chromatography provided for the first time the means of surveying the phenolic constituents of plants and for their separation and identification. There was an explosion of activity in this field after 1945, none more so than that of Bate-Smith and Tony Swain.

In 1951, Bate-Smith developed and first described a coloration method to detect the presence of condensed tannins (also called proanthocyanidins) in plant materials. This reaction is based on heating in acidic conditions and gives rise to anthocyanidin pigments.

Bate-Smith recommended the use of the Forestal solvent for the isolation of leuco-anthocyanins in 1954.

In 1973, he suggested an assay based on the precipitation of hemoglobin by tannins.

Bate-Smith has been awarded the food technology Bor S. Luh International Award in 1964. He became a Commander of the Order of the British Empire (CBE) in 1963 for his work at the Low Temperature Research Station.

Bate-Smith married Margaret Elizabeth Bate Hardy (born 11 May 1902 in Cambridgeshire) some time before 1939. They adopted a son David William. Margaret died on 2 November 1982, and is buried in St Andrew's churchyard, Girton. Edgar died in Linton, Cambridgeshire on 8 May 1989. He was survived by his adopted son.
