= Forestal =

Forestal is a solvent used in chromatography, composed of acetic acid, water, and hydrochloric acid in a 30:10:3 ratio by volume. It is useful for isolating anthocyanins in room-temperature chromatography using standard filter paper.
