= Phytochemistry (journal) =

Peer-reviewed scientific journal

- Discipline: Phytochemistry
- Language: English
- Edited by: Eleni Skaltsa

Publication details
- History: 1961–present
- Publisher: Elsevier
- Frequency: 18/year
- Impact factor: 4.072 (2020)

Standard abbreviations
- ISO 4: Phytochemistry

Indexing
- CODEN: PYTCAS
- ISSN: 0031-9422
- LCCN: 65008341
- OCLC no.: 780563468

Links
- Journal homepage; Online access

Phytochemistry is a peer-reviewed scientific journal covering pure and applied plant chemistry, plant biochemistry and molecular biology. It is published by Elsevier and is an official publication for the Phytochemical Society of Europe, the Phytochemical Society of North America, and the Phytochemical Society of Asia.

A sister journal Phytochemistry Letters is published since 2008.

== Abstracting and indexing ==
Phytochemistry is abstracted and indexed in:

- AGRICOLA
- BIOSIS
- Cambridge Scientific Abstracts
- Chemical Abstracts
- CAB Abstracts
- Current Contents/Agriculture, Biology & Environmental Sciences
- Current Contents/Life Sciences
- EMBASE
- Elsevier BIOBASE
- MEDLINE
- Medicinal and Aromatic Plant Abstracts
- PASCAL
- Plant Science Database
- Science Citation Index
- Scopus

According to the Journal Citation Reports, the journal has a 2020 impact factor of 4.072.
