= Nepenthes maryae =

Scientific classification
- Kingdom: Plantae
- Clade: Embryophytes
- Clade: Tracheophytes
- Clade: Angiosperms
- Clade: Eudicots
- Order: Caryophyllales
- Family: Nepenthaceae
- Genus: Nepenthes
- Species: N. maryae

Binomial name
- Nepenthes maryae Jebb & Cheek (2016)

Tropical pitcher plant endemic to Sulawesi

Nepenthes maryae is a tropical pitcher plant native to Central Sulawesi province on the Indonesian island of Sulawesi. It is known from a single herbarium specimen collected in 2000 on an undisclosed mountain at 2,100 m above sea level, where the species grew in submontane mossy forest alongside N. eymae, N. nigra, and N. tentaculata. It is a member of section Tentaculatae, which also includes 8 other species from Borneo and Sulawesi: N. glabrata, N. hamata, N. muluensis, N. murudensis, N. nigra, N. pitopangii, N. tentaculata, and N. undulatifolia. Nepenthes maryae is distinguished from all other species in this group by the presence of short hairs on the lower surface of the pitcher lid and bracts on the majority (c. 75%) of flowers.

The specific epithet maryae commemorates Mary Mendum (née Bates) (1945–2004), a botanist at the Royal Botanic Garden Edinburgh.
