= Nepenthes rubromaculata =

Nepenthes rubromaculata may refer to:

- Nepenthes rubromaculata Hort.Veitch ex Wilson (1877) — horticultural hybrid ((N. gracilis × N. khasiana) × N. veitchii)
- Nepenthes rubromaculata auct. non Hort.Veitch ex Wilson: Sh.Kurata (1984) — synonym of N. glabrata
