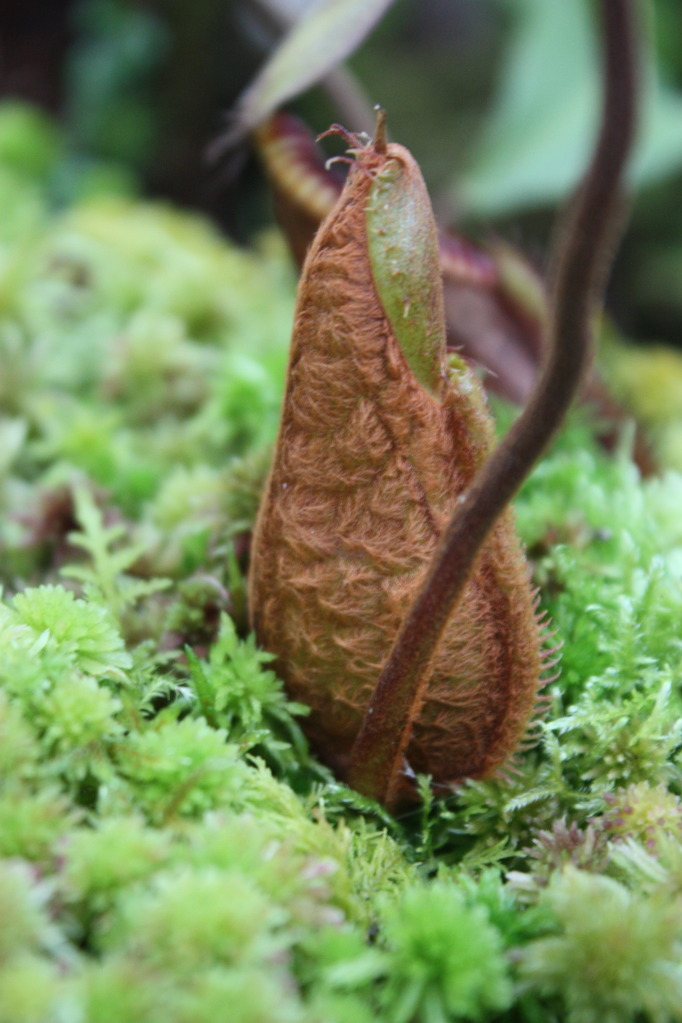
- A developing pitcher of N. diabolica, showing its shaggy, fur-like indumentum

Scientific classification
- Kingdom: Plantae
- Clade: Tracheophytes
- Clade: Angiosperms
- Clade: Eudicots
- Order: Caryophyllales
- Family: Nepenthaceae
- Genus: Nepenthes
- Species: N. diabolica

Binomial name
- Nepenthes diabolica A.Bianchi, Chi.C.Lee, Golos, Mey, M.Mansur & A.S.Rob.

Synonyms
- Nepenthes hamata auct. non J.R.Turnbull & A.T.Middleton: S.McPherson (2009); S.McPherson & A.S.Rob. (2012) [=N. diabolica/N. hamata]; Nepenthes ronchinii A.Bianchi ined. (2016)

= Nepenthes diabolica =

Species of pitcher plant from Sulawesi

Nepenthes diabolica is a tropical pitcher plant known only from a single mountain in Central Sulawesi, where it occurs at c. 2,200–2,300 m above sea level. It is characterised by an exceptionally developed peristome and conspicuous, woolly pitcher indumentum. Morphologically it is closest to N. hamata, the only other species from Sulawesi with a similarly elaborated peristome.

The species was known to botanists as early as 2005, when Ch'ien Lee announced the discovery of a new form of N. hamata with an exceptionally dense indumentum. For years afterwards the taxon was informally known in cultivation as N. hamata "red hairy" or simply "red hairy hamata". Later it became known as Nepenthes ronchinii, in honor of Italian botanist Luigi Ronchini, before the taxon was formally described as Nepenthes diabolica in 2020.

The specific epithet diabolica is Latin for "diabolical" or "devilish" and refers to both the typical red colouration of the lower pitchers and their greatly enlarged peristome teeth.
