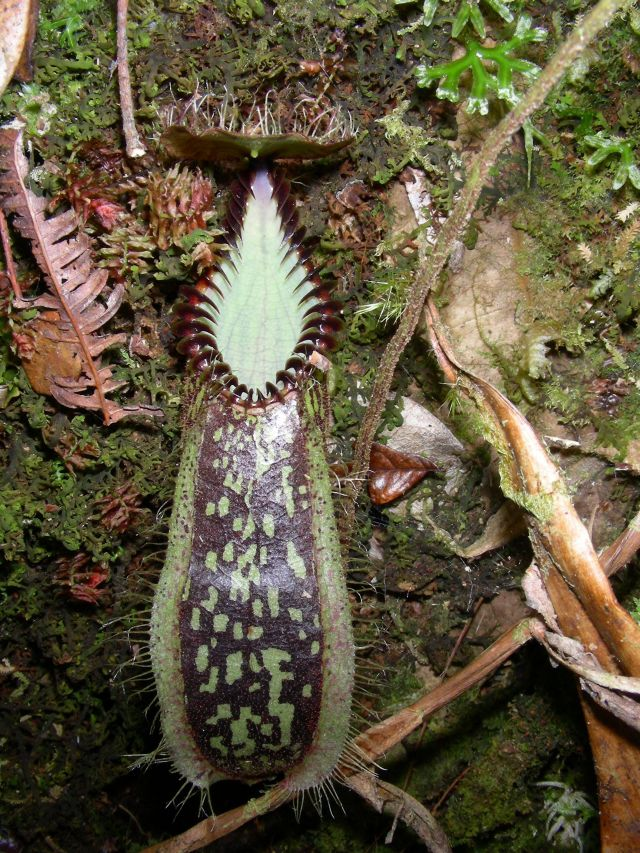
- A lower pitcher of Nepenthes hamata from Mount Katopasa, Sulawesi

Conservation status
- Least Concern (IUCN 3.1)

Scientific classification
- Kingdom: Plantae
- Clade: Tracheophytes
- Clade: Angiosperms
- Clade: Eudicots
- Order: Caryophyllales
- Family: Nepenthaceae
- Genus: Nepenthes
- Species: N. hamata

Binomial name
- Nepenthes hamata J.R.Turnbull & A.T.Middleton (1984)

Synonyms
- Nepenthes dentata Sh.Kurata (1984) [=N. hamata/N. nigra]; Nepenthes hamata auct. non J.R.Turnbull & A.T.Middleton: S.McPherson (2009); S.McPherson & A.S.Rob. (2012) [=N. diabolica/N. hamata]; Nepenthes hamatus J.R.Turnbull & A.T.Middleton (1984) [original spelling]

= Nepenthes hamata =

Species of pitcher plant from Indonesia

Nepenthes hamata /nɪˈpɛnθiːz həˈmɑːtə/ is a tropical pitcher plant endemic to Sulawesi, where it grows at elevations of 1,400–2,500 m above sea level.

The specific epithet hamata is derived from the Latin word hamatus, meaning "hooked". It describes the appearance of the highly developed peristome teeth of this species.

== Botanical history ==
=== Early history and formal descriptions ===
Nepenthes hamata was first encountered by Western explorers many decades before its formal description and recognition by science. Dutch botanist Pierre Joseph Eyma collected herbarium material of this species as early as 1938; this would later be used to designate a type specimen.

In 1984, two formal descriptions of this species were published in close succession: Shigeo Kurata described it under the name N. dentata in The Gardens' Bulletin Singapore, while John R. Turnbull and Anne T. Middleton called it N. hamatus in the journal Reinwardtia.

As explained in the introduction to his describing paper on N. dentata, Kurata first became aware of the species more than a decade earlier, on a 1972 visit to Herbarium Bogoriense:

During my stay at the Herbarium Bogoriense in 1972, for the study of their Nepenthes collection, I was able to examine much undetermined material from several Indonesian islands. While going through those collected by P. J. Eyma in Sulawesi, I came across a very interesting Nepenthes. After subsequent study, I am now able to conclude that it should be described as a new species.

The name N. dentata was first published in Kurata's 1976 guide, Nepenthes of Mount Kinabalu, where it was included in a table of all Nepenthes species known at the time and asterisked with the note "Not yet established".

=== Questions over nomenclatural priority ===
The formal descriptions of N. dentata by Kurata and N. hamatus by Turnbull and Middleton were published almost concurrently, leading to uncertainty over which name held nomenclatural priority. A similar situation surrounded the publication of N. eymae / N. infundibuliformis and N. glabrata / N. rubromaculata, which were described by the same three authors.

Nepenthes hamata (emended with a feminine suffix to match the gender of Nepenthes) gained greater currency and was said to have been published 21 days prior to N. dentata. However, in 1994 Matthew Jebb wrote that the "priority of this name over N. dentata [...] is in fact in serious doubt, since the 'preprinted' Reinwardtia issue was technically not 'freely available' in terms of the Botanical Code". Taxonomist Jan Schlauer determined that the publication of Turnbull and Middleton's paper preceded Kurata's formal description of N. dentata in The Gardens' Bulletin Singapore, but came after Kurata's article about the species in the Journal of Insectivorous Plant Society. While some authors referred to the species as N. dentata in the following years, the name N. hamata enjoyed greater popularity and has for this reason been retained in all major monographs on the genus.

In the years following its description, some authors considered the two taxa as separate species and there was even speculation among growers that N. hamata represented a hybrid involving the "true" species, N. dentata. Schlauer considers N. dentata to be a heterotypic synonym of N. hamata.

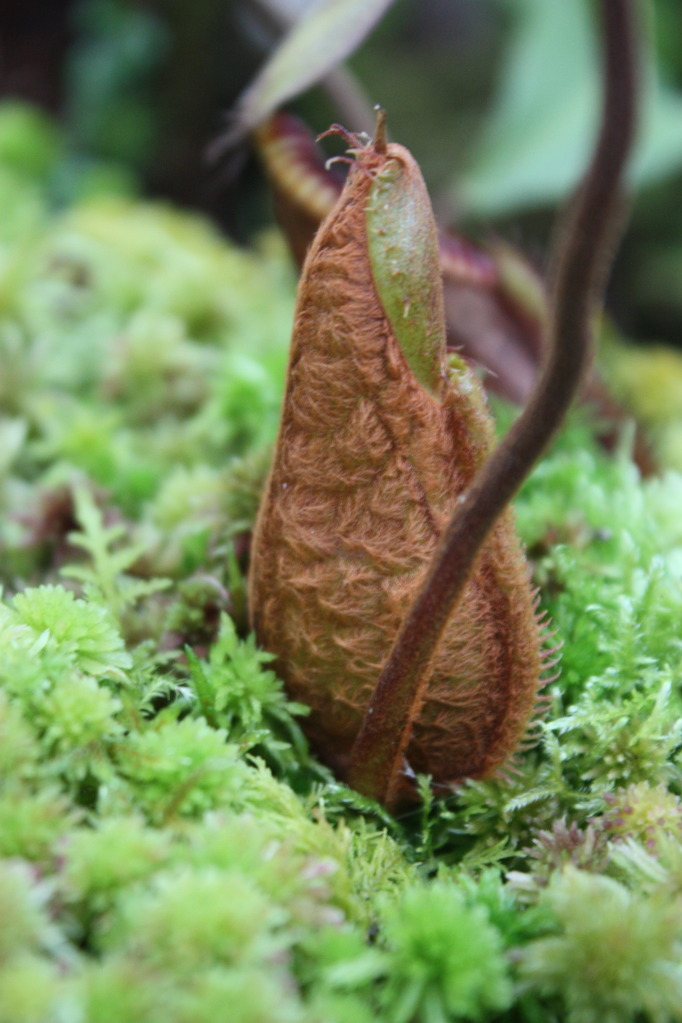
A developing lower pitcher of N. diabolica (once considered to be a hairy variant of N. hamata), showing its shaggy, fur-like indumentum

=== Type material ===
The type specimen of N. hamata is J.R.Turnbull & A.T.Middleton 83121a, which was collected from the west ridge of Mount Lumut, Central Sulawesi (at the coordinates 1°07′S 121°39′E), at an altitude of 1,850–1,900 m, on September 19, 1983. In their description of the species, Turnbull and Middleton indicated that the type material had been deposited at Herbarium Bogoriense (BO), the herbarium of the Bogor Botanical Gardens. However, Martin Cheek and Matthew Jebb were unable to locate it there and, referring collectively to the type material of N. hamata, N. glabrata, and N. infundibuliformis (which were all described by Turnbull and Middleton in the same paper), wrote that "[n]one of these collections has been found at the herbaria they cite".

An early collection by Dutch botanist Pierre Joseph Eyma, designated as Eyma 3572, represents the type material of N. dentata. The specimens of this series were taken from a site on the north spur of Mount Lumut, between bivouacs II and III, on September 3, 1938. Both the lectotype and isotype are deposited at Herbarium Bogoriense (BO).

In addition to the herbarium specimens of N. hamata mentioned here, a number of others have appeared in the literature.^{[note a]}

=== Horticultural interest ===
Nepenthes hamata remained very rare in cultivation until around 1996. Its scarcity and striking appearance made it particularly desirable to collectors, and individual plants commanded prices of approximately US$300–400 during this time. The significant commercial value of the species encouraged wild collection by both local and foreign plant hunters. Beginning in 1995, Ch'ien Lee oversaw a Nepenthes artificial propagation program at Malesiana Tropicals, a company based in Sarawak, Malaysian Borneo. Seeds of N. hamata, which had been collected in the wild by Lee, were used to multiply plant material in vitro in the company's tissue culture laboratory. By 2001, Malesiana Tropicals had a sales inventory of more than 500 individuals of the species, supplying both hobbyists and commercial growers as well as botanical gardens and researchers. The increased supply led to a sharp fall in prices. The price of N. hamata was predicted in 2001 to stabilise at roughly $50 per plant, greatly limiting the incentive for wild collection. The species however remains highly sought-after and is still somewhat of a horticultural rarity.

=== Discovery of "red hairy hamata" ===
In early 2005, Ch'ien Lee announced the discovery of a new form of N. hamata with an exceptionally dense indumentum:

Thought people might be interested to see this stunning new variety of N. hamata which I recently photographed in Sulawesi. It comes from a mountain quite far away from the type locality of N. hamata and shows that this species has a good bit of geographical variation throughout its range. Compared with the variety from Gunung Lumut (which is probably the source of all the plants currently in cultivation?), the pitchers of this new form are more robust and entirely red with a dense coating of rusty brown hairs. Also, the bristles on the lid are not as numerous nor branched. In all other vegetative respects it matches N. hamata very well.

In response to subsequent speculation about the plant's taxonomic status, Lee wrote that it "merely represents a geographical variant of N. hamata". It was informally known as N. hamata "red hairy" or simply "red hairy hamata" (often abbreviated as 'RHH'). In 2020, this taxon was described as a species in its own right: N. diabolica. Like the type form of N. hamata, N. diabolica has been raised to flowering size in cultivation and used to make hybrids with other Nepenthes species.

=== Later developments ===
British geographer Stewart McPherson published an updated description of the species in his 2009 monograph, Pitcher Plants of the Old World. The book also covered the closely related undescribed taxon N. sp. Sulawesi, which McPherson had observed with Greg Bourke in 2007. Nepenthes sp. Sulawesi was described as N. nigra in McPherson's 2011 work, New Nepenthes.

== Description ==
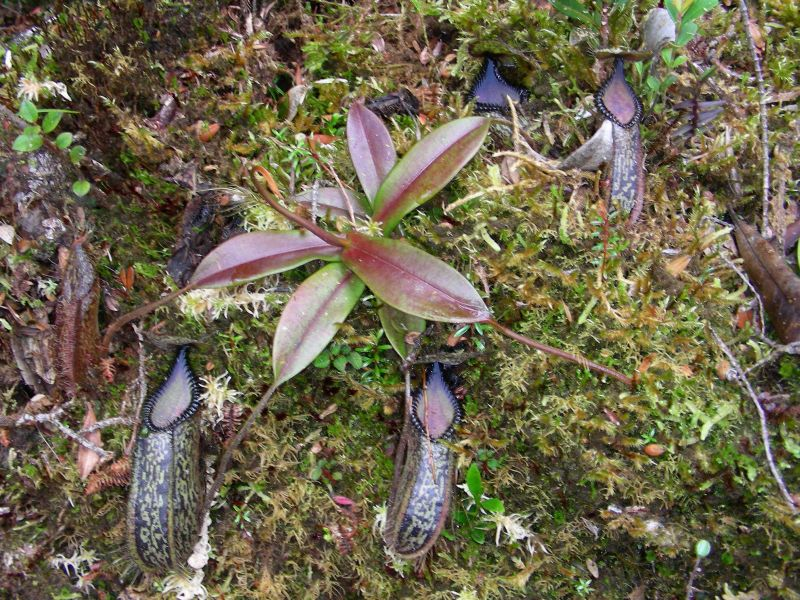
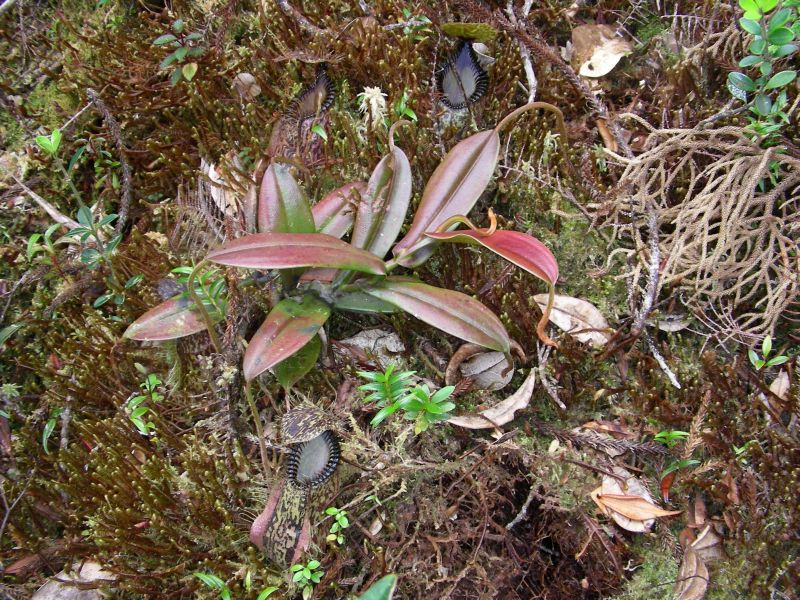
A young rosette plant growing among moss and detritus (left) and a slightly older specimen that has already begun scrambling along the ground (right), both from Mount Katopasa.

Nepenthes hamata is a strong climber. The stem, which may be branched, reaches a maximum length of around 7 m. It is terete to obtusely trigonous and varies in diameter from up to 3 mm in rosettes and short stems, to 4–5 mm in climbing stems. In the former, the internodal length is typically up to 6 mm and in the latter 3.5–6 cm.

=== Leaves ===
Leaves are sessile and chartaceous in texture. The shape of the lamina (leaf blade) is variable: it may be linear, lanceolate, or slightly elliptic.

In the case of rosettes and short stems, the lamina is typically oblanceolate to oblong-elliptic and measures up to 7.5 cm in length by 2.5 cm in width. It has an acute apex and does not exhibit a peltate tendril attachment. The laminar base is amplexicaul, clasping the stem and giving it a subperfoliate appearance. Auricles may be present, although their level of development varies. The lamina may be slightly decurrent down the stem, but not prominently so.

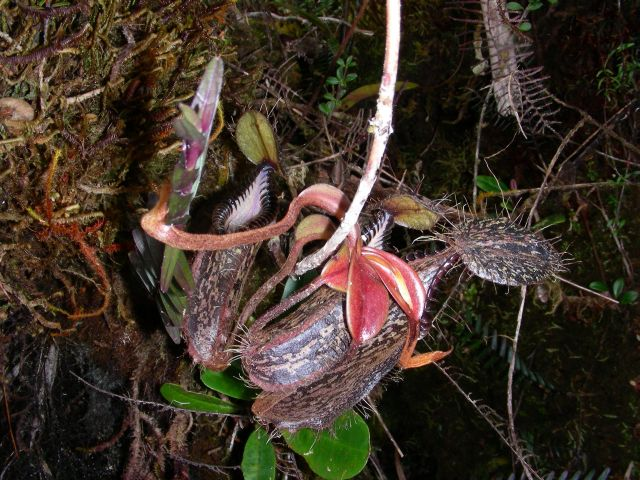
An offshoot from an old climbing stem bearing bright red laminae and disproportionately large rosette pitchers

Laminae produced on climbing stems are predominantly oblong-elliptic in shape, but may rarely be lanceolate. They are larger than those borne on shorter stems, but nonetheless relatively short, measuring 5–15 cm in length by 1.8–4 cm in width. The laminar apex may be acute to obtuse, while the base is abruptly contracted and clasps the stem; it may be decurrent for up to 1.5 cm in some populations. Two (rarely up to four) longitudinal veins are present on either side of the midrib. They are restricted to the outer third to half (rarely up to two-thirds) of the laminar surface. Pinnate veins are inconspicuous; they are patent and branching.

=== Pitchers ===
Rosette and lower pitchers are only produced for a short time before the plant transitions into a scrambling vine (although they may be produced later on offshoots from the original stem). They grow up to 18 cm high by 5 wide. They are ovate in the basal fifth to half of the pitcher cup, being bulbous to varying degrees in this portion, often narrowly so. The pitcher is narrower in the upper part and may be cylindrical or slightly infundibular towards the orifice. The boundary between these two portions is often delineated by a pronounced hip. The ventral face of the pitcher is flattened. A pair of wings up to 16 mm wide runs down the ventral surface of the pitcher cup. These wings bear densely packed filiform fringe elements up to 19 mm long, which commonly exceed the width of the wings themselves. These filaments are often arranged in pairs, spaced around 2 mm apart, and are usually branched dichotomously once or twice. The waxy zone of the inner surface is well developed.

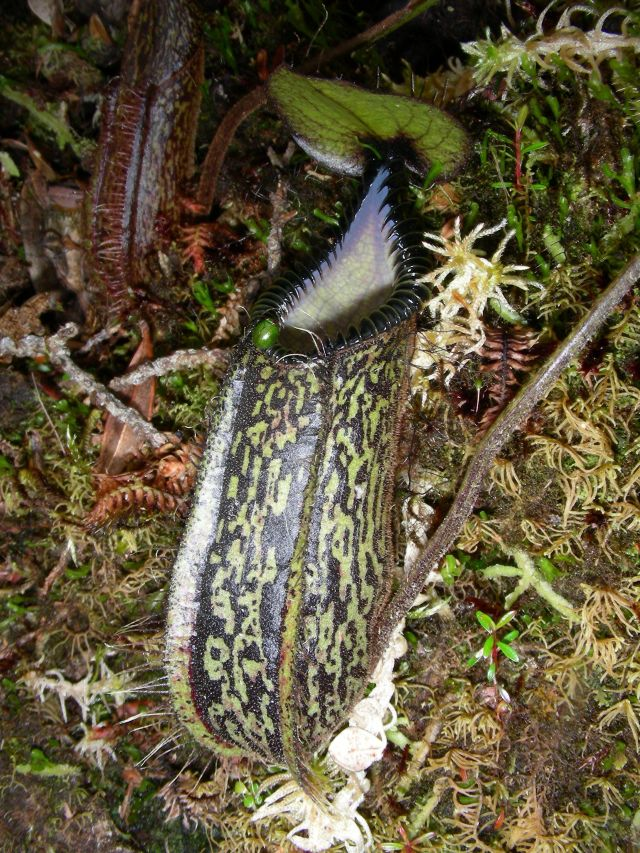
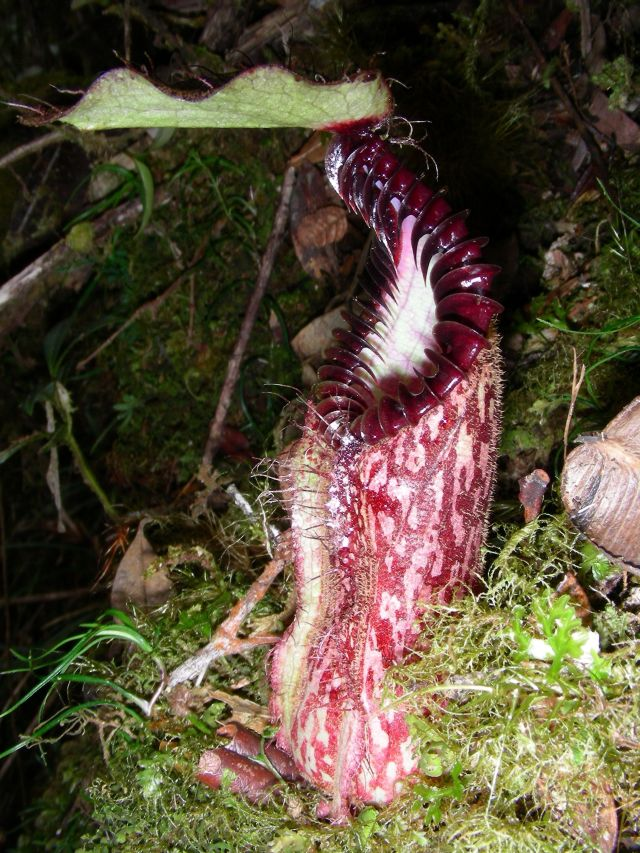
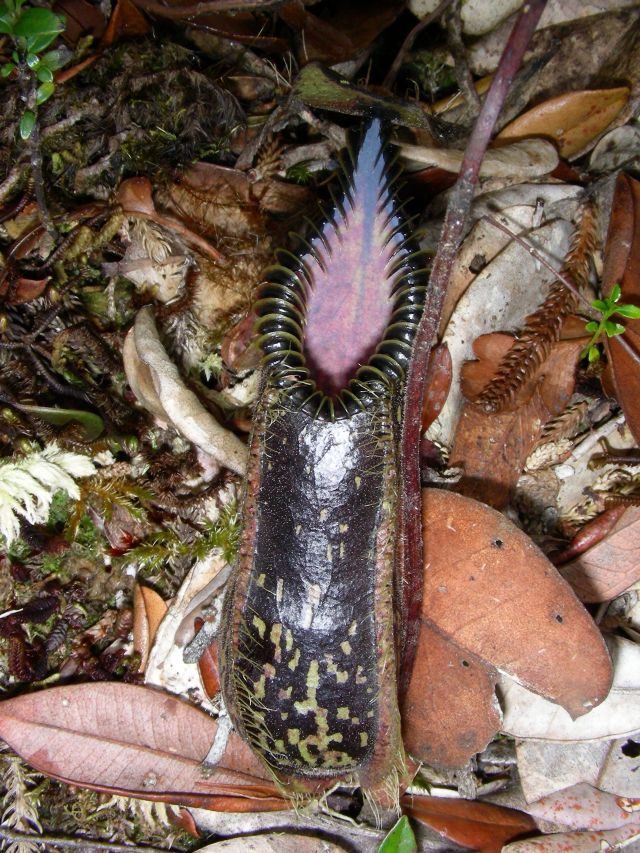
Three lower pitchers, all produced by plants from Mount Katopasa, showing the variability in pigmentation exhibited by this species. The pitcher on the left has quite typical colouration, similar to that of plants from Mount Lumut. The reddish pitcher in the centre exhibits a conspicuous indumentum, widely spaced peristome ribs, and a noticeably inclined neck that overarches the pitcher mouth. The trap on the right has unusually dark pigmentation, with the dark blotches merging to form a solid purple surface. This specimen also displays golden highlights on the peristome ribs and a colourful waxy zone on the interior.
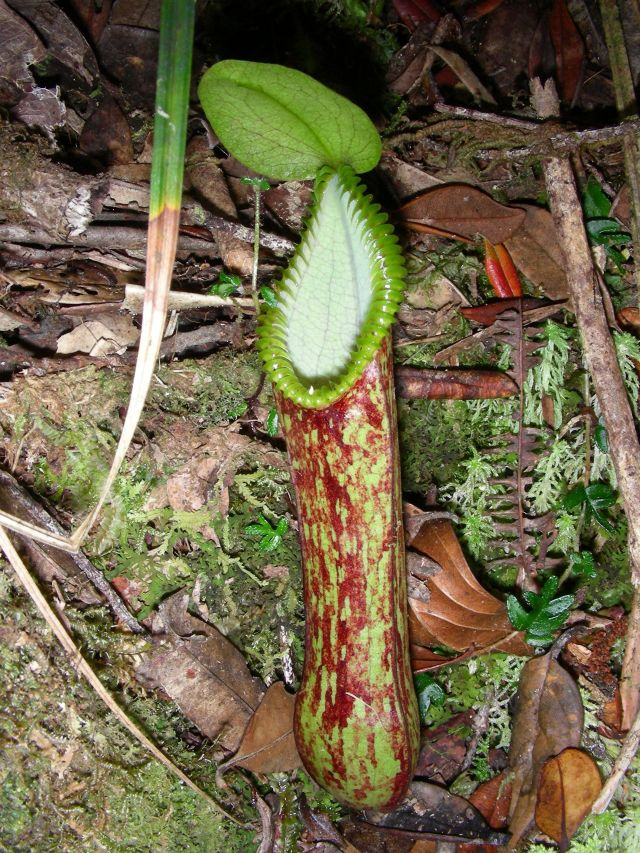
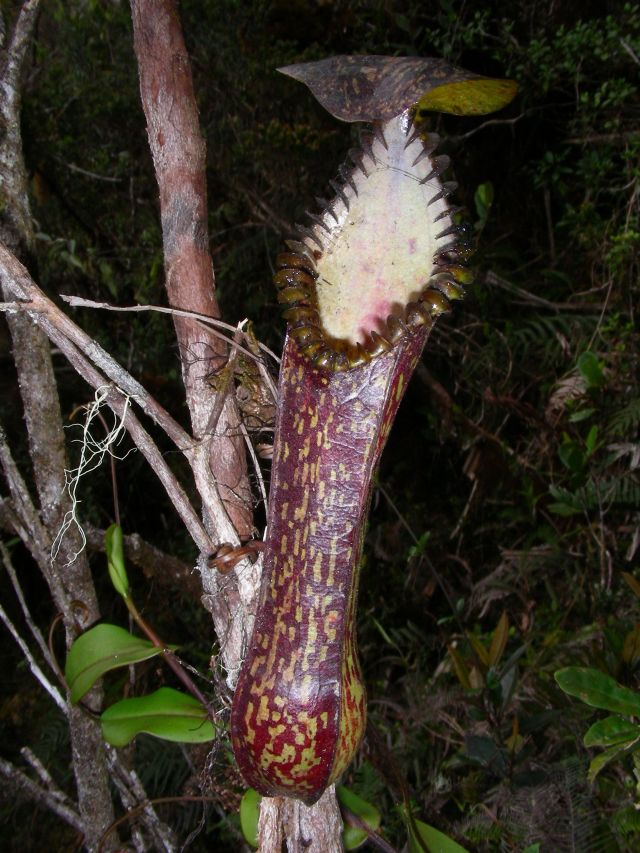
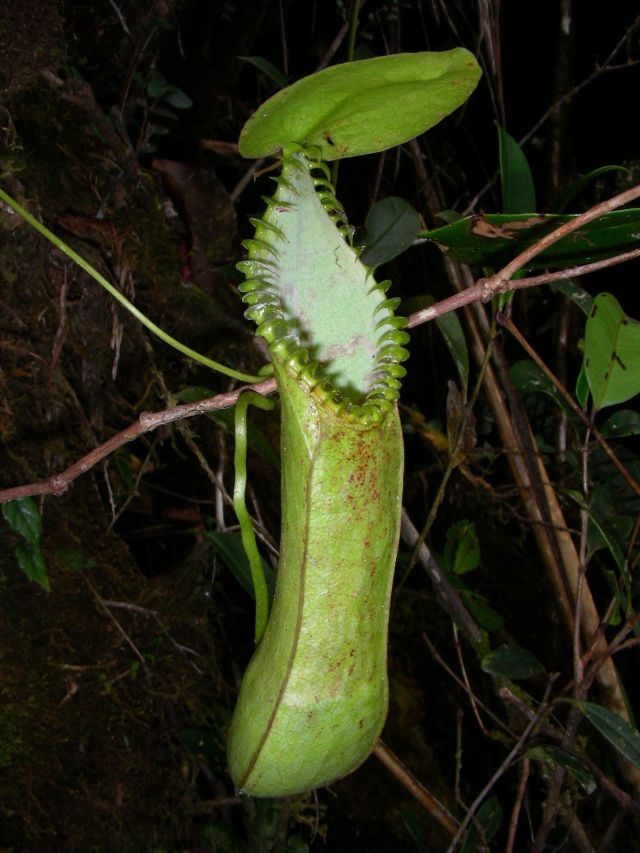
A trio of upper pitchers from Mount Katopasa. The pitcher on the left displays relatively small and numerous peristome teeth. The other two have distinctly rhomboid mouths with well-developed ribs, although they differ markedly in external mottling.

The pitcher mouth is often distinctly rhomboid in shape, but may also be oval or elliptic. It has a highly oblique insertion and is concave when viewed in profile. The mouth rises at the rear to form a tapered neck, which may be held upright or be inclined forward over the pitcher orifice. The species is noted for having possibly the most developed peristome in the genus. It is cylindrical to slightly flattened, glossy, rigid, and up to 5 mm wide (excluding the teeth). It consists of expanded ribs up to 6 mm high and spaced up to 5 mm apart. The entire flanges can measure up to 15 mm in length, although their size and number differ between populations (a typical number being approximately 20 on each side of the orifice). These flanges form exceptionally long, incurved teeth at the inner edge of the pitcher orifice. The teeth are sickle-shaped (falcate) and extend approximately 7 mm into the interior, as measured from the inner edge of the peristome to the tooth apex. The outer edge of the peristome is entire, with the recurved flanges extending for around 2 mm past the rim. The teeth of the neck may assume a dagger-like shape and measure up to 10 mm by 2 mm. These uppermost teeth are often noticeably splayed forward.

The pitcher lid or operculum is elliptic to ovate and measures up to 6 cm in length by 5 cm in width. It is held roughly horizontally and often has upturned margins. The apex is rounded, whereas the base is occasionally cordate or subcordate. No appendages are present on the lower surface, but multicellular filiform appendages may be found on the upper surface, though this feature is often unstable and may be absent altogether. These 'hairs' or 'tentacles' are up to 20 mm long and may be branched. They arise from the ends of the lid veins and may number as many as 45 on each side of the lid. They are mainly restricted to the outer margins of the lid, where they are around 3 rows deep. The lower surface of the lid bears sparsely distributed nectar glands in the form of shortly elliptic, bordered pits. These are very small and inconspicuous, measuring only 0.1–0.2 mm in diameter. A spur up to 9 mm long is inserted near the base of the lid. It may be simple or repeatedly branched to the point of being fasciculate. The herbarium material examined by Cheek and Jebb exhibited spurs that were basally 5-branched, with each branch being secondarily ramified.

Upper pitchers are similar in shape to their terrestrial counterparts, though usually more elongated, growing to 7–25 cm in height by 1.2–6 cm in width. The basal fifth to third of the trap is ovate, narrowing and becoming cylindrical to slightly infundibular above. As in lower pitchers, a conspicuous hip often marks the boundary between these two parts. In most cases, a pair of narrow ribs is present in place of the wings, although fully developed fringed wings are sometimes encountered. The peristome is often even more developed in aerial traps, with longer and more widely spaced teeth, which curve completely outwards in some populations. These teeth are usually 12–16 mm long by 2–3 mm high, and spaced 2.5–6 mm apart. Upper pitchers resemble lower ones in most other respects.

=== Inflorescence ===
Nepenthes hamata has a racemose inflorescence. The male inflorescence is 8–15 cm long, of which the peduncle constitutes 2.4–10 cm and the rachis up to 8 cm. The peduncle has a basal diameter of around 3 mm. Flowers are borne solitarily on ebracteate pedicels measuring 10–15 mm in length by 0.1–0.3 mm in width. The pedicels number around 22 per inflorescence. Tepals are elliptic, reflexed, and 1.5–3 mm long by 1–1.5 mm wide. Androphores are 1–2.5 mm long and bear anther heads measuring 0.6–0.8 mm by 0.8–1.4 mm. One infructescence was measured at 8.5 cm long by roughly 5 cm wide (fruits included), with a peduncle measuring 6.5 cm in length and having a basal diameter of 2.25 mm. Fruits number around 15 per infructescence and bear valves 19–20 mm long by 3.5–4.5 mm wide. As in most Nepenthes species, the seeds are filiform. They are around 8 mm long by 0.4–0.6 mm wide.

=== Indumentum ===
The extent of the indumentum is highly variable. Most populations are predominantly glabrous, having soft orange to brown hairs only on developing pitchers, tendrils, and the underside of the midrib.

Despite the variation between populations, no infraspecific taxa of N. hamata have been described.

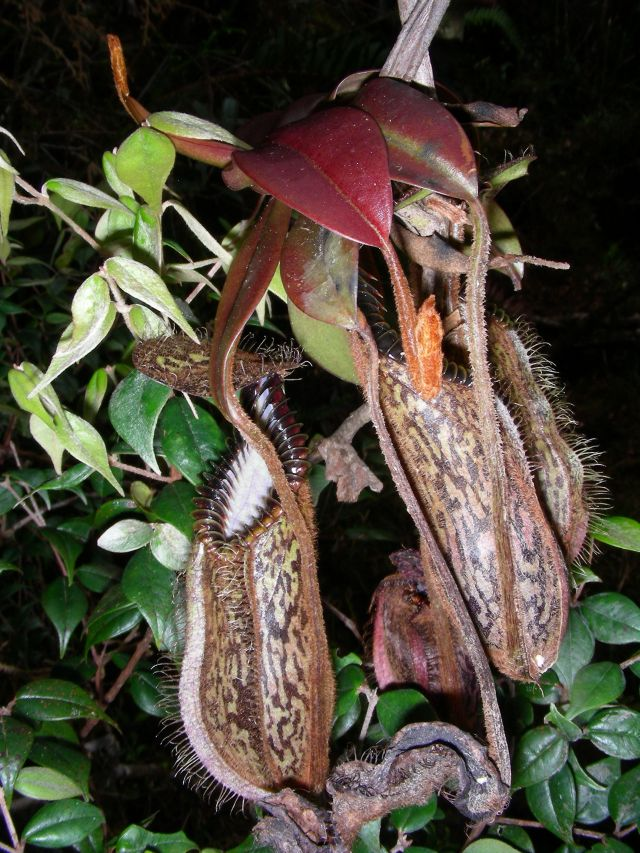
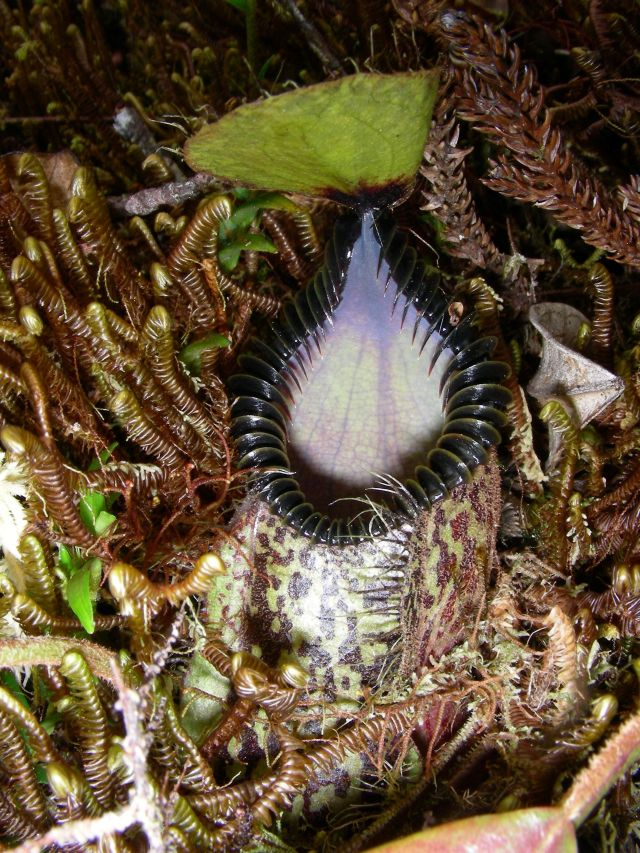
An aerial rosette (left) and a lower pitcher embedded in moss (right), both from Mount Katopasa

== Ecology and conservation ==
Nepenthes hamata is endemic to the Indonesian island of Sulawesi, where it has been recorded primarily from the eastern portion of Central Sulawesi province (including large parts of the East Peninsula). The species has a known altitudinal distribution of 1,400–2,500 m above sea level.

Nepenthes hamata may grow terrestrially or as an epiphyte. It is found in lower and upper montane mossy forest and among scrub vegetation on mountain ridges and summits. In such habitats it experiences high relative humidity and often partially shady conditions. It is known to occasionally form natural hybrids with N. glabrata and N. tentaculata. The wild cross with N. glabrata was first reported by Ch'ien Lee in December 2006.

The conservation status of N. hamata is listed as Least concern on the IUCN Red List, based on an assessment carried out in 2018. In 2009, Stewart McPherson wrote that the species is "widespread" across its range and that most populations are "remote and not generally threatened at present". Nepenthes hamata is known from at least two protected areas (Lore Lindu National Park and Morowali Nature Reserve), although the full extent of its range is unknown and it is likely to occur on a number of as yet unexplored peaks. McPherson emphasised the need to monitor populations of specific variants, particularly the red hairy form (now known as N. diabolica), because "[l]oss of diversity [...] may become a legitimate concern in the future as a result of collection pressures".

== Related species ==
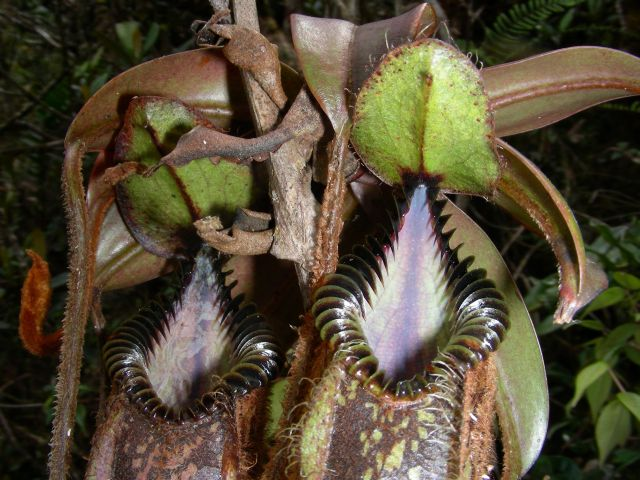
A closeup of a pair of N. hamata pitchers, showing the distinctive peristome structure that distinguishes this species from its closest relatives

Nepenthes hamata belongs to what has been called the "Hamata group", which also includes four other closely related species from Borneo and Sulawesi: N. glabrata, N. muluensis, N. murudensis, and N. tentaculata. More recently, N. nigra has joined this group of related taxa. In their 2001 monograph, "Nepenthaceae", Martin Cheek and Matthew Jebb also suggested a close relative in the Sumatran species N. adnata.

Nepenthes hamata is very closely allied to N. tentaculata. It shares with this species the multicellular filiform appendages of the upper lid, as well as the general form of its laminae and pitchers. Nepenthes hamata clearly differs from N. tentaculata in the development of its peristome, which bears exaggerated flange-like extensions; N. tentaculata lacks conspicuous teeth altogether.

In their 2001 monograph, Martin Cheek and Matthew Jebb wrote that although the available herbarium material of N. hamata (around seven collections at the time) showed wide variation in peristome development, with some specimens appearing "very close to N. tentaculata", this did not represent a continuum of intergrades between N. hamata at one extreme and N. tentaculata at the other, but rather was due to a combination of lower and upper pitchers (the latter having more highly developed peristome teeth).

== Notes ==
a. Other published specimens of N. hamata include Lack & Grimes 1783 (includes an infructescence and female flowers) and Lack & Grimes 1784 (includes a climbing stem with an upper pitcher and male inflorescence). Both of these specimens, along with Eyma 3573, are illustrated in a line drawing by Camilla Speight in Martin Cheek and Matthew Jebb's 2001 monograph, "Nepenthaceae".

A 2001 review of the Nepenthes material deposited at Herbarium Bogoriense found seven sheets of N. hamata within its collections. These specimens had been collected in montane forest at 1800–1900 m.
