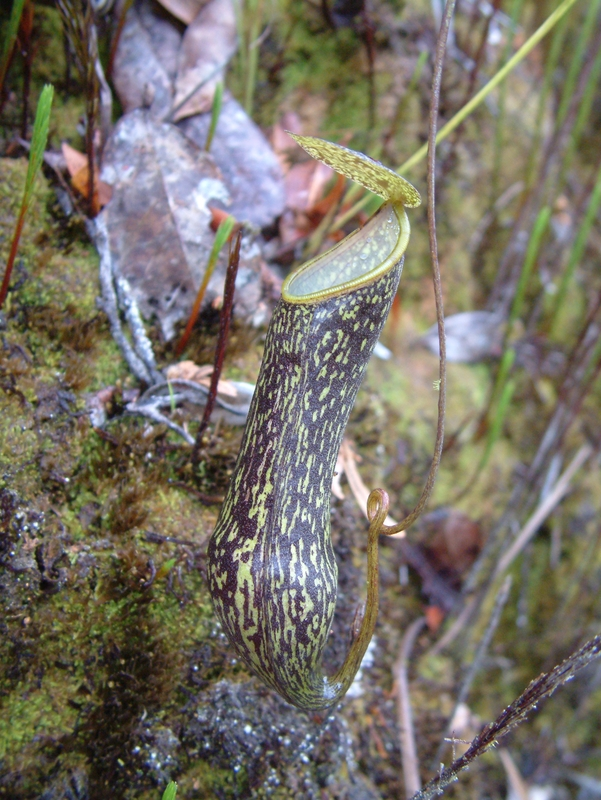
- An upper pitcher of Nepenthes nigra

Conservation status
- Least Concern (IUCN 3.1)

Scientific classification
- Kingdom: Plantae
- Clade: Tracheophytes
- Clade: Angiosperms
- Clade: Eudicots
- Order: Caryophyllales
- Family: Nepenthaceae
- Genus: Nepenthes
- Species: N. nigra

Binomial name
- Nepenthes nigra Nerz, Wistuba, Chi.C.Lee, Bourke, U.Zimm. & S.McPherson (2011)

Synonyms
- Nepenthes dentata Sh.Kurata (1984) [=N. hamata/N. nigra]; Nepenthes sp. Sulawesi S.McPherson (2009)

= Nepenthes nigra =

Species of pitcher plant from Indonesia

Nepenthes nigra is a tropical pitcher plant known from a number of mountains across Central Sulawesi, where it grows at elevations of 1,500–2,700 m (4,900–8,900 ft) above sea level. The specific epithet nigra refers to the dark colouration of the pitchers and stem. The species is closely related to N. hamata and N. tentaculata.

== Natural hybrids ==
- N. glabrata × N. nigra
- N. nigra × N. tentaculata
