= List of Nepenthes natural hybrids =

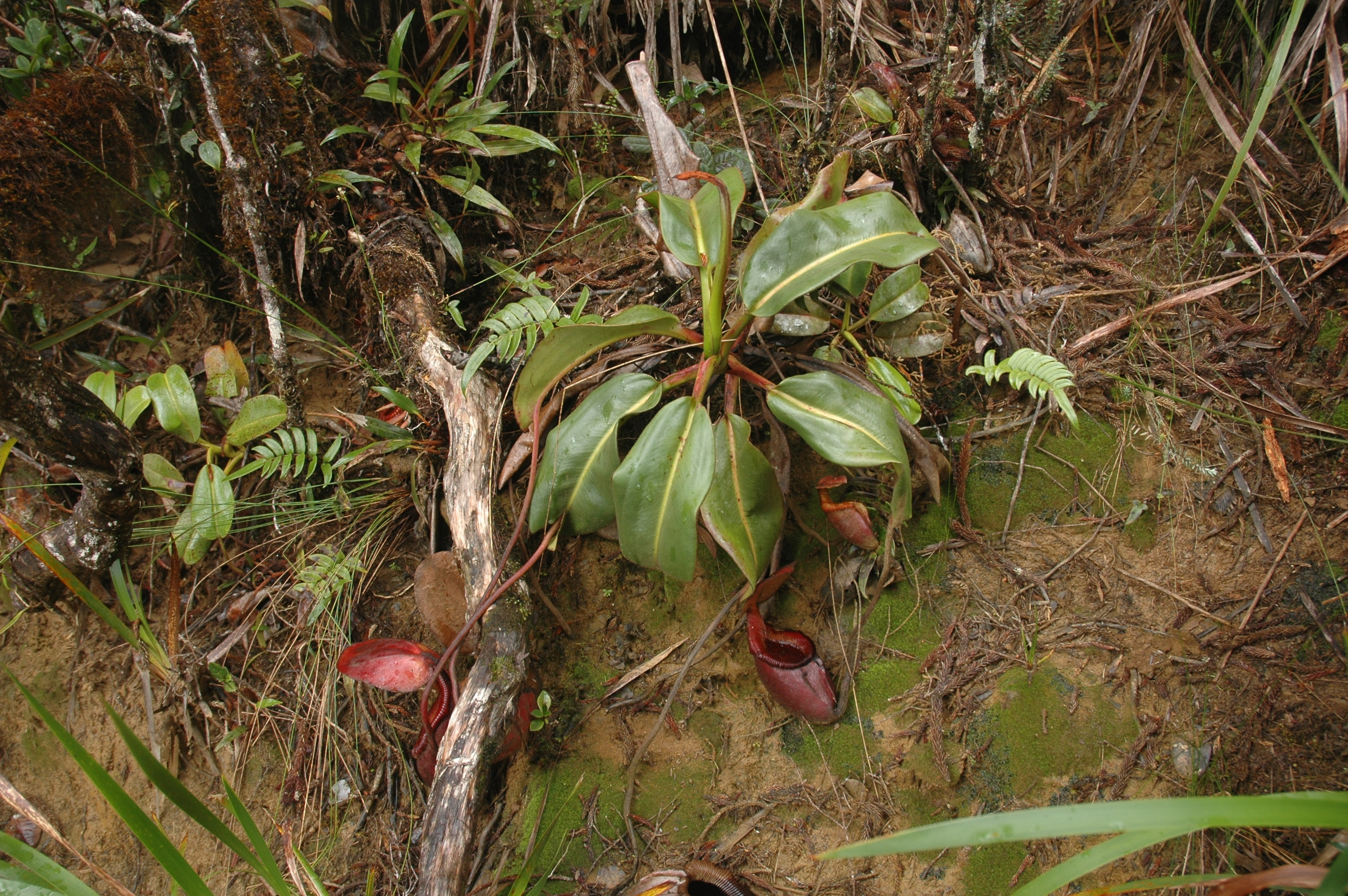
Nepenthes × kinabaluensis (centre) dwarfs its smaller parent species, N. villosa (left).

This list of Nepenthes natural hybrids is a comprehensive listing of all recorded natural hybrids involving species of the carnivorous plant genus Nepenthes. Hybrids that are not endemic to a given region are marked with an asterisk.

== Named natural hybrids ==
Name	Parent species	Authority	Year	Image	Distribution	Altitudinal distribution
N. × alisaputrana	N. burbidgeae × N. rajah	J.H.Adam & Wilcock	1992		Borneo	
N. × bauensis	N. gracilis × N. northiana	Chi.C.Lee	2004		Borneo	
N. × cantleyi	N. bicalcarata × N. gracilis	Hort.Westphal nom.nud.	1991		Borneo	
N. × cincta	N. albomarginata × N. northiana	Mast.	1884		Borneo	
N. × ferrugineomarginata	N. albomarginata × N. reinwardtiana	Sh.Kurata	1982		Borneo, Sumatra	
N. × harryana	N. edwardsiana × N. villosa	Burb.	1882		Borneo	
N. × hookeriana	N. ampullaria × N. rafflesiana	Hort.Veitch ex Mast.	1881		Borneo, Peninsular Malaysia, Singapore, Sumatra	0–450 m
N. × kinabaluensis	N. rajah × N. villosa	Sh.Kurata ex Sh.Kurata	1984		Borneo	2420–3030 m
N. × kuchingensis	N. ampullaria × N. mirabilis	Sh.Kurata	1982		Borneo, New Guinea, Peninsular Malaysia, Sumatra, Thailand	
N. × merrilliata	N. alata × N. merrilliana	Hort. ex Fleming nom.nud.	1979		Philippines (Mindanao, Samar)	
N. × mirabilata	N. alata × N. mirabilis	Hort. ex Lauffenburger nom.nud.	1995		Philippines (Mindanao)	
N. × pangulubauensis	N. gymnamphora × N. mikei	Hort.B.R.Salmon & Maulder ex P.Mann in sched. nom.nud.	1996		Sumatra	
N. × pyriformis	N. inermis × N. talangensis	Sh.Kurata	2001		Sumatra	
N. × sarawakiensis	N. muluensis × N. tentaculata	J.H.Adam, Wilcock & Swaine	1993		Borneo	
N. × sharifah-hapsahii	N. gracilis × N. mirabilis	J.H.Adam & Hafiza	2007		Borneo, Peninsular Malaysia, Sumatra, Thailand	
N. × trichocarpa	N. ampullaria × N. gracilis	Miq.	1858		Borneo, Peninsular Malaysia, Singapore, Sumatra, Thailand	0–800 m
N. × truncalata	N. alata × N. truncata	Hort.Bednar nom.nud.	1994		Philippines (Mindanao)	
N. × trusmadiensis	N. lowii × N. macrophylla	Marabini	1983		Borneo	
N. × tsangoya	(N. alata × N. merrilliana) × N. mirabilis	Tsang ex Lauffenburger nom.nud.	1995		Philippines (Mindanao)	
N. × ventrata	N. alata × N. ventricosa	Hort. ex Fleming nom.nud.	1979		Philippines	

== By distribution ==
=== Borneo ===
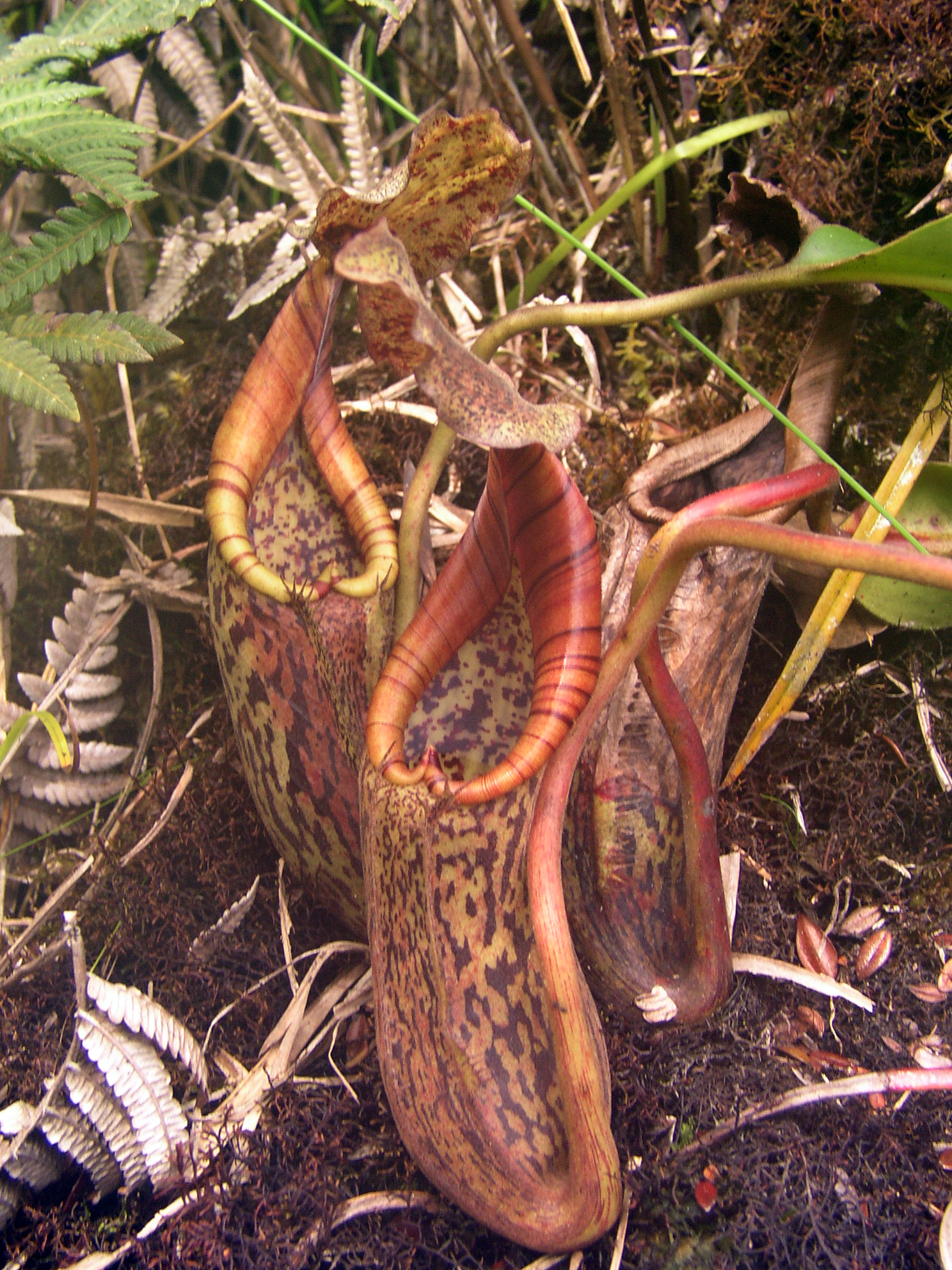
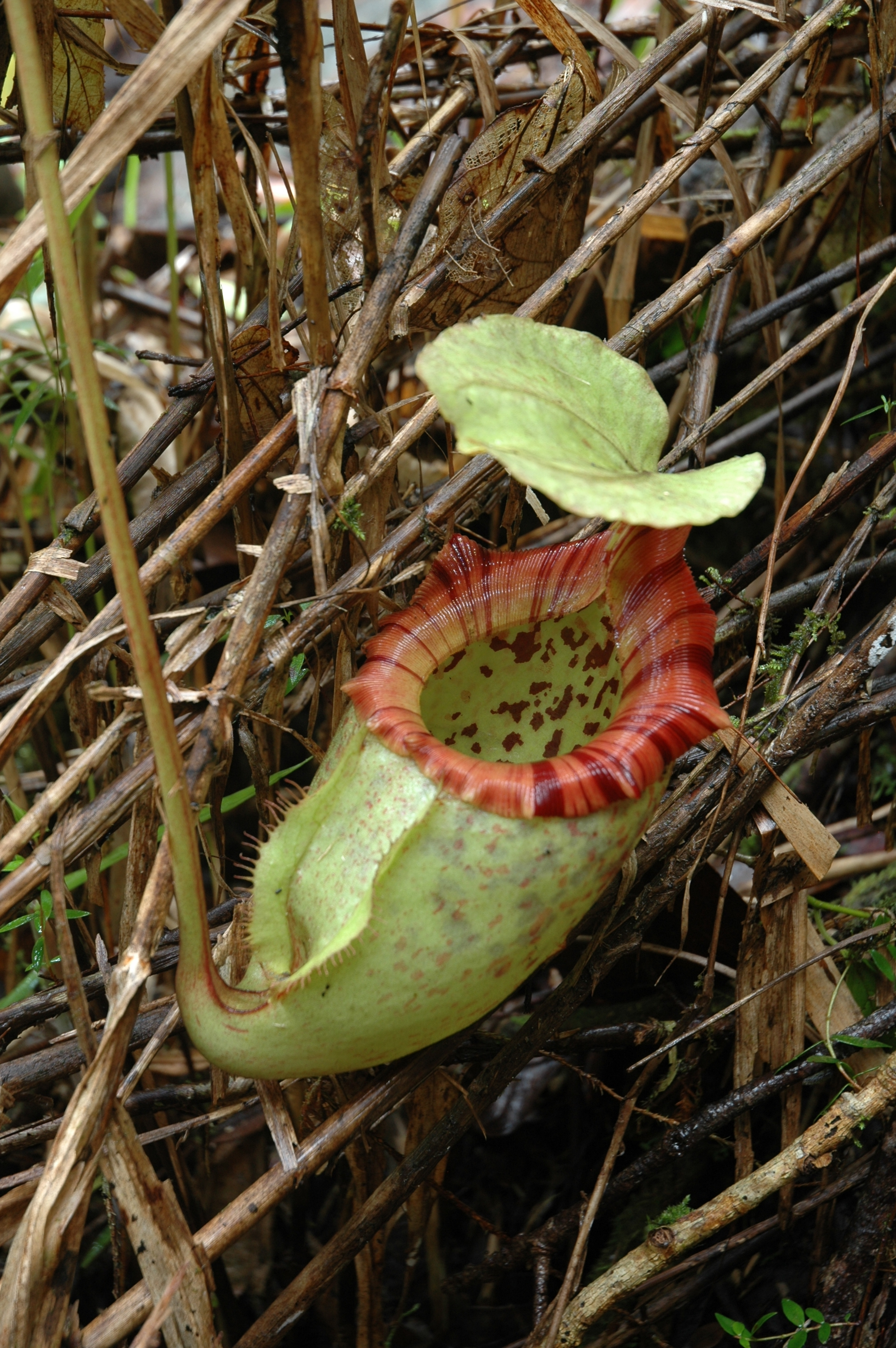
Left: N. burbidgeae × N. fusca
Right: N. burbidgeae × N. rajah (N. × alisaputrana)
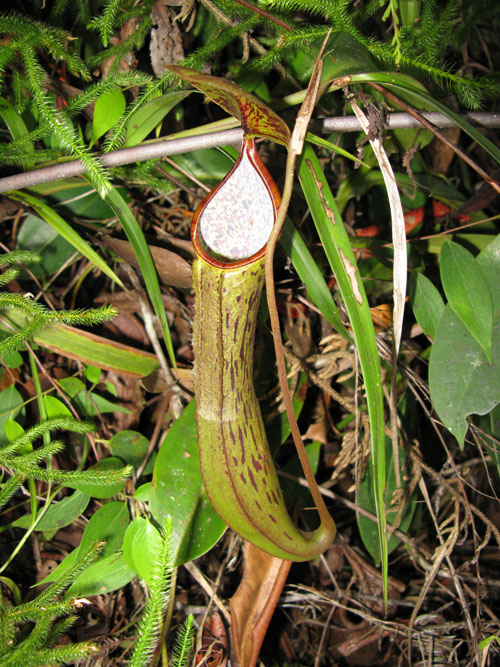
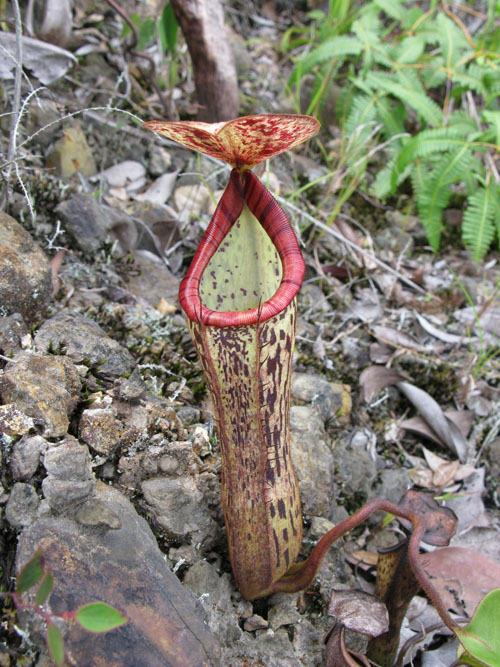
Left: N. fusca × N. reinwardtiana
Right: N. fusca × N. stenophylla
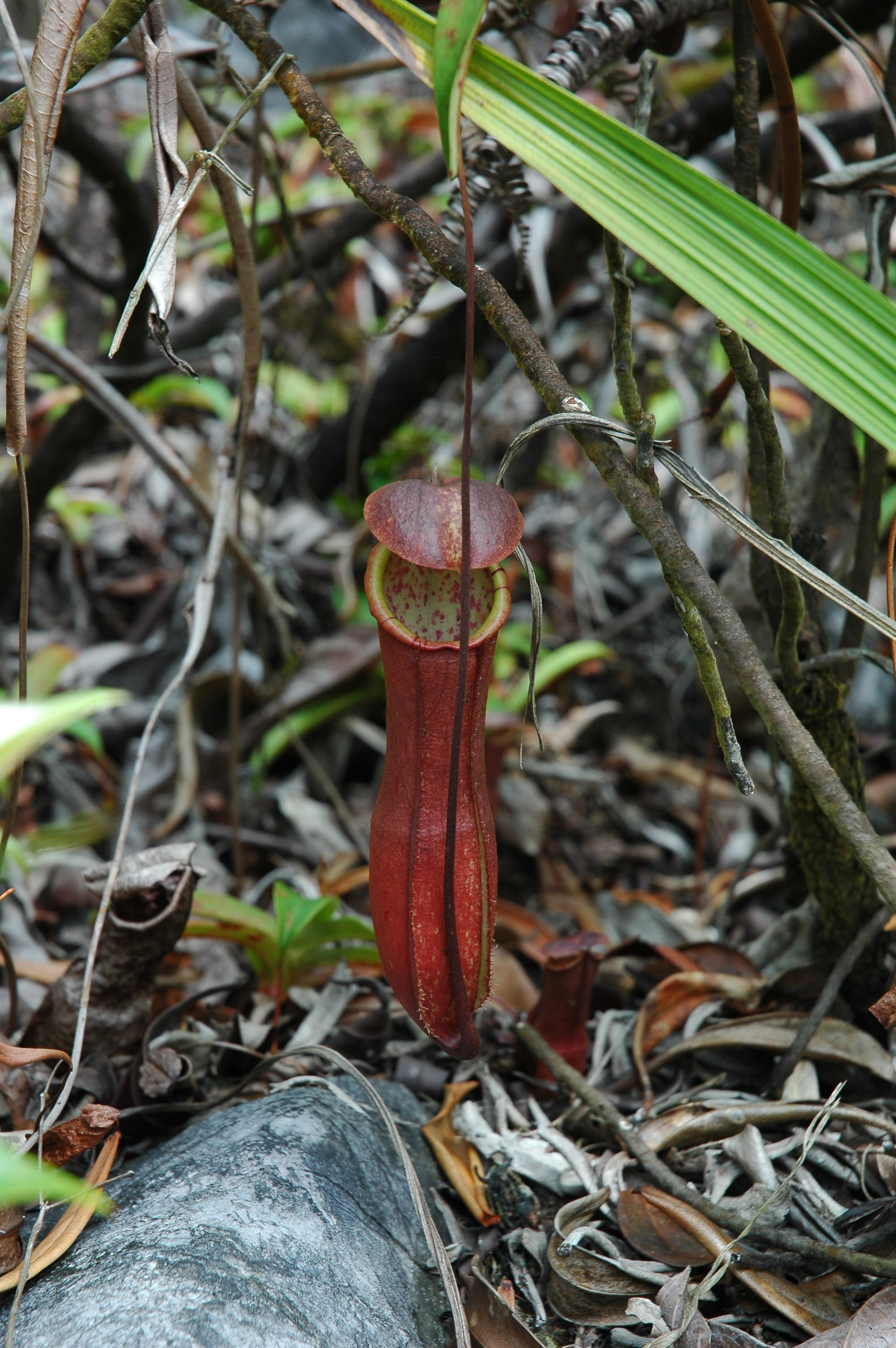
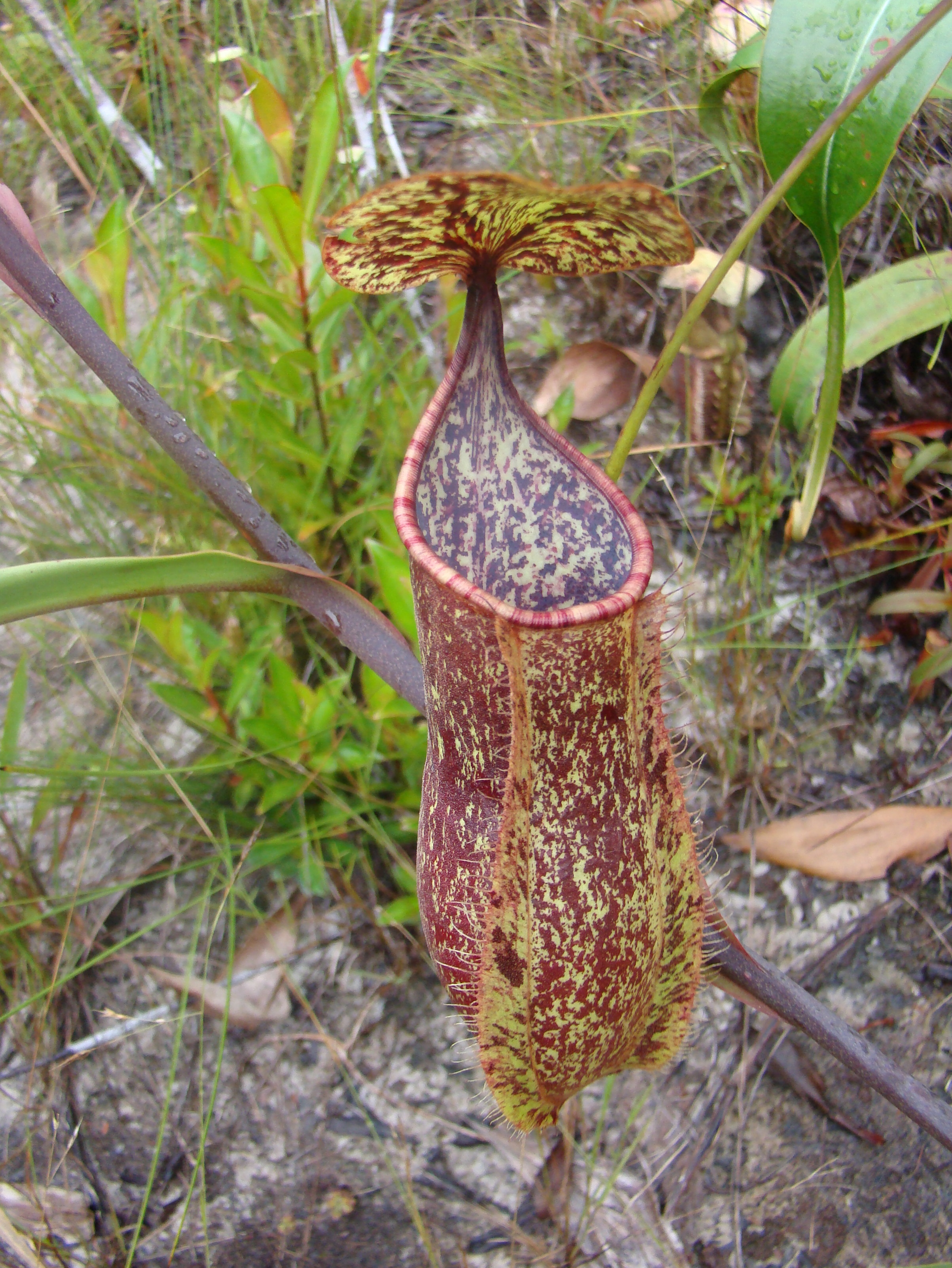
Left: N. gracilis × N. northiana (N. × bauensis)
Right: N. gracilis × N. rafflesiana
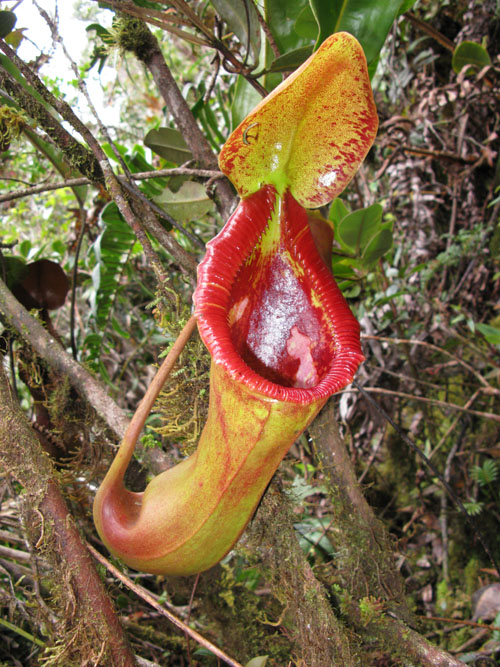
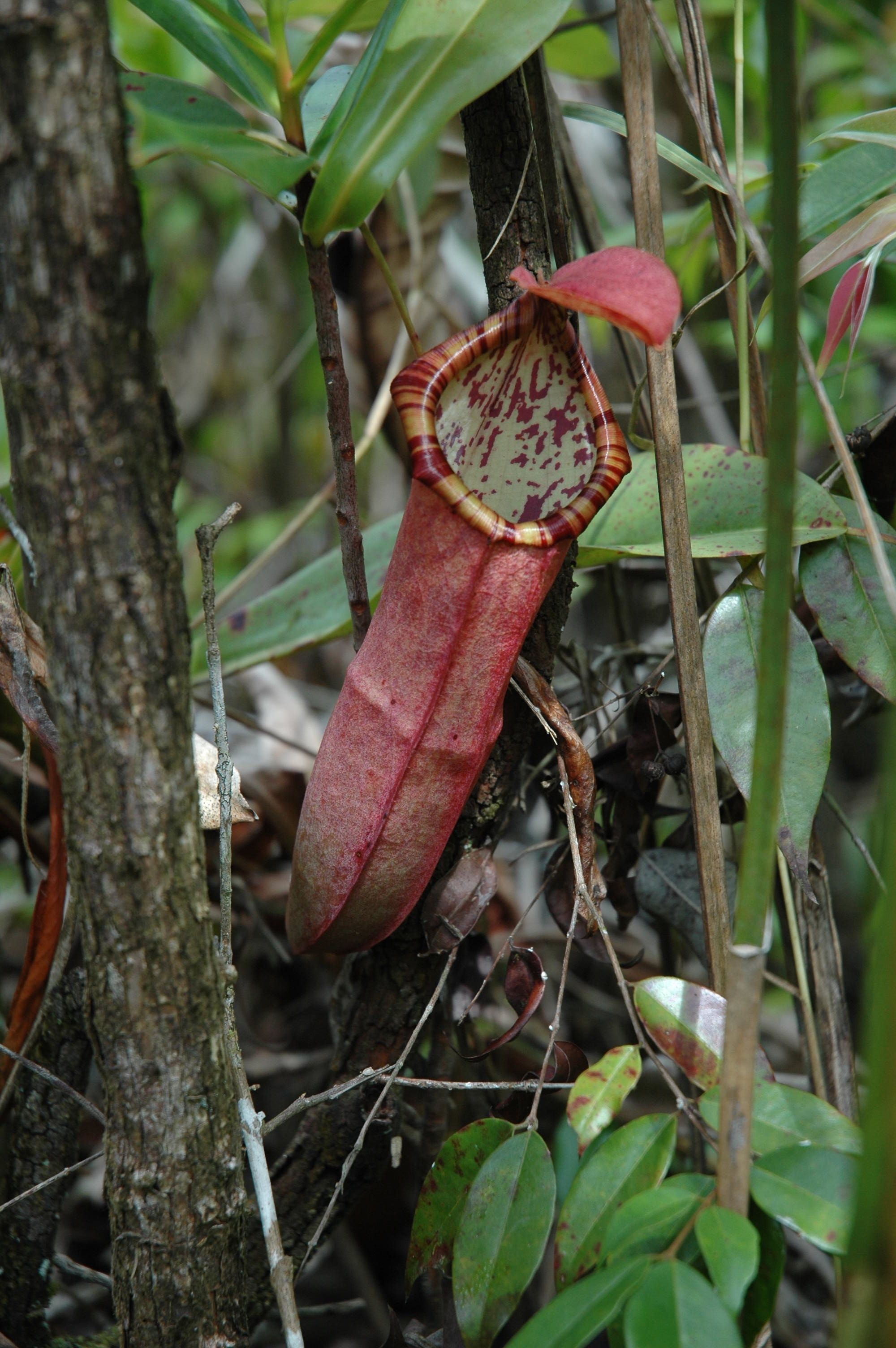
Left: N. lowii × N. macrophylla (N. × trusmadiensis)
Right: N. mirabilis × N. northiana
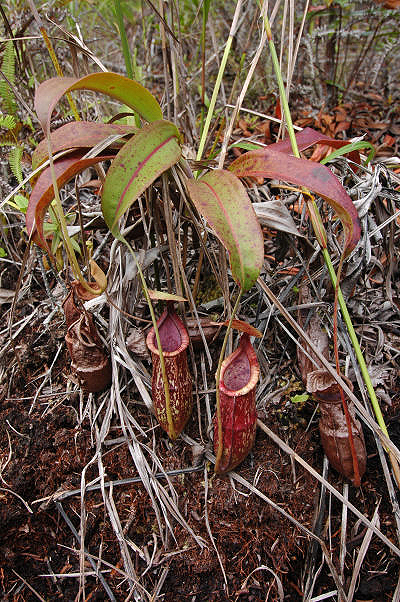
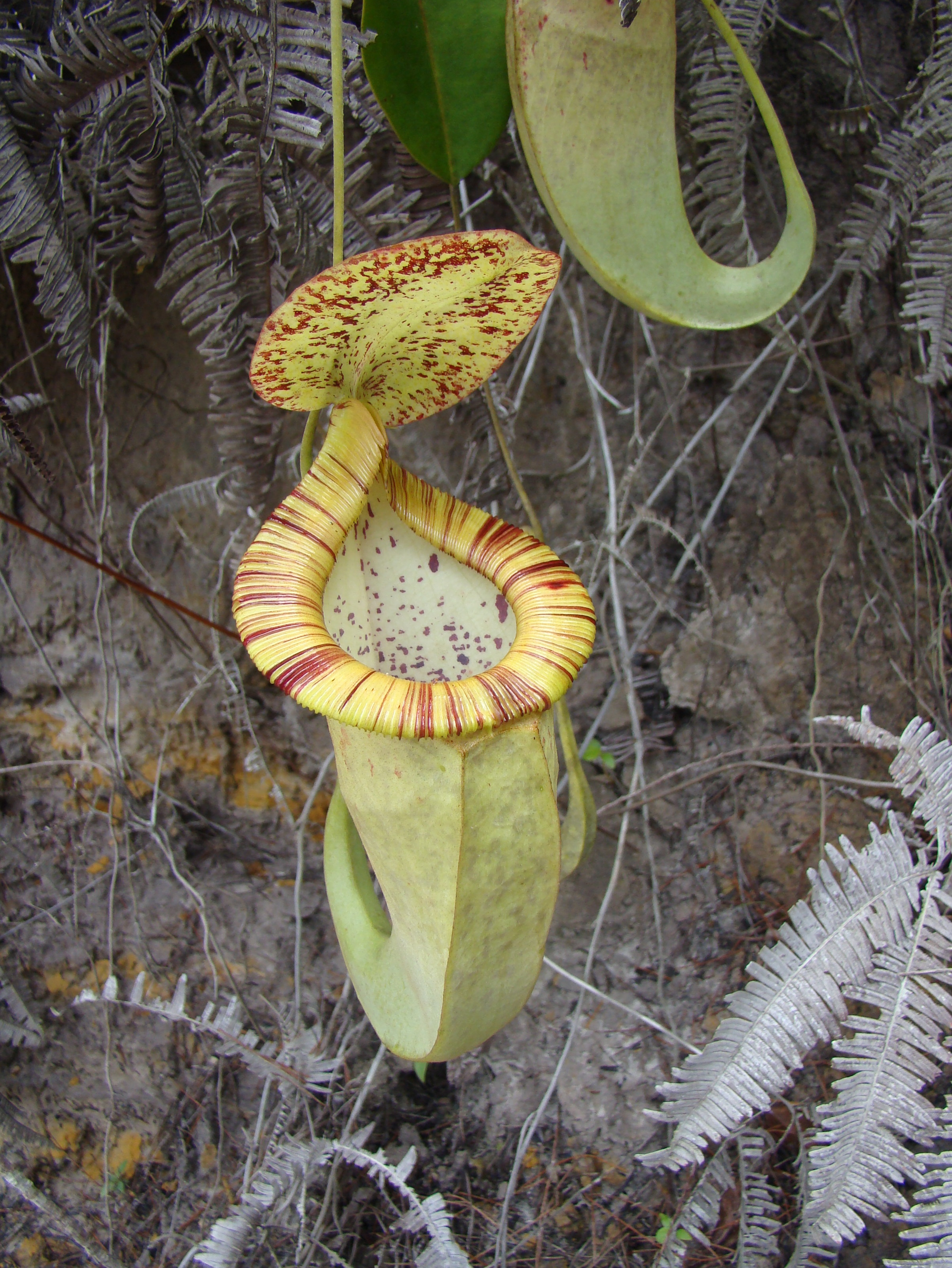
Left: N. mirabilis × N. rafflesiana
Right: N. mirabilis var. echinostoma × N. rafflesiana
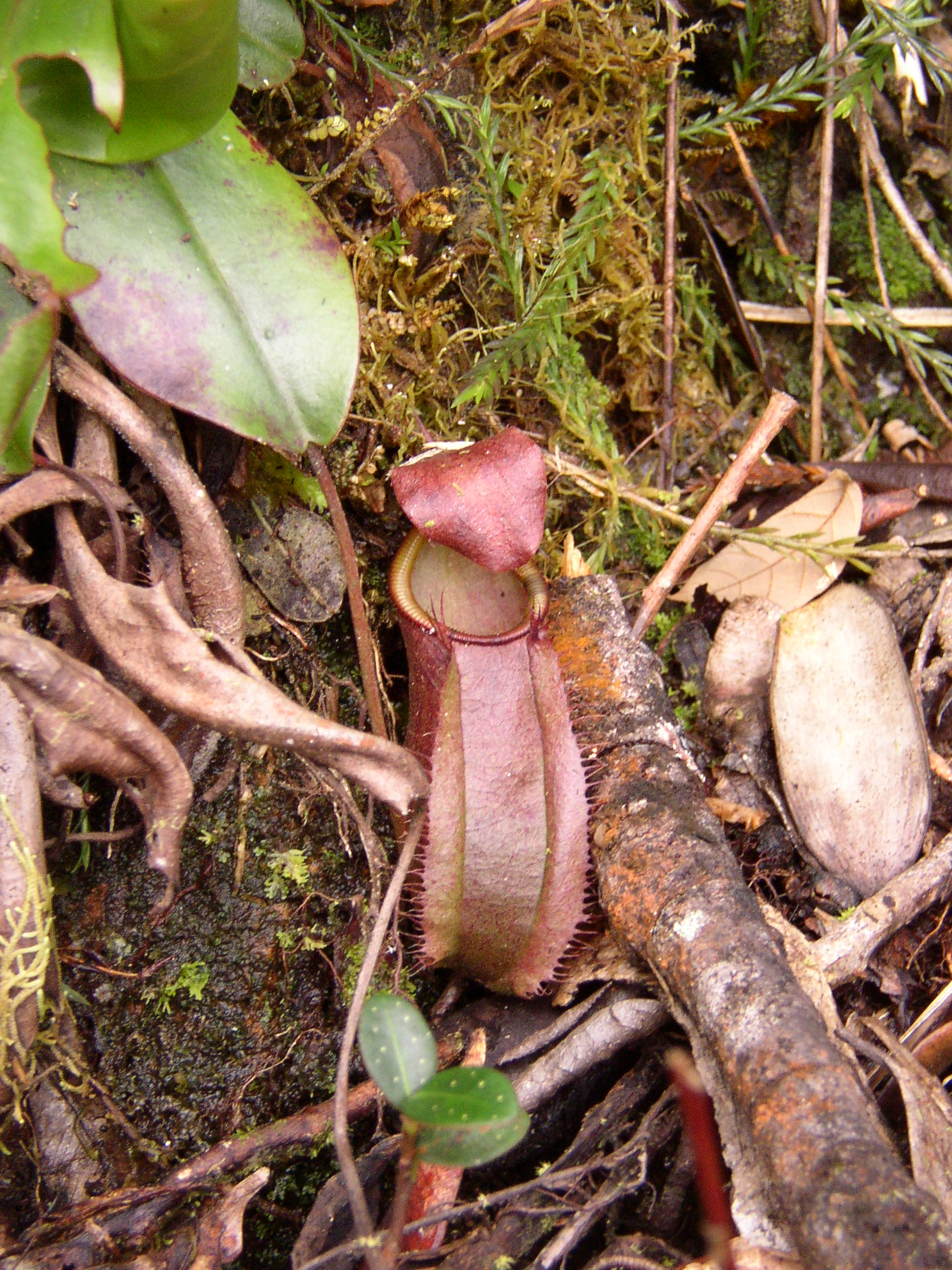
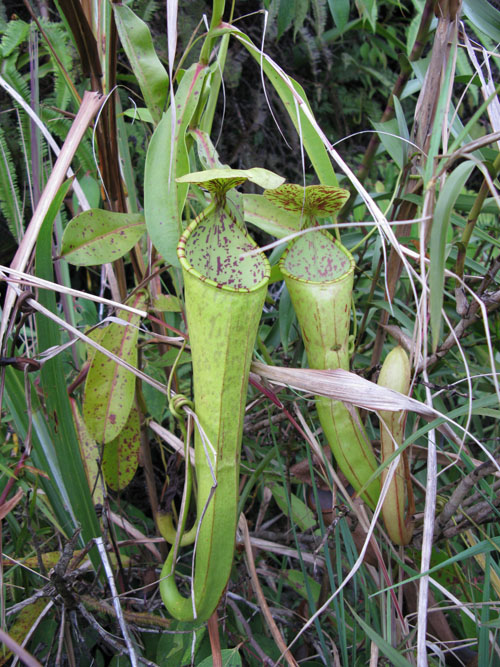
Left: N. rajah × N. tentaculata
Right: N. reinwardtiana × N. stenophylla

Nepenthes natural hybrids recorded from Borneo.

1. N. albomarginata × N. ampullaria *
2. ? N. albomarginata × N. chaniana
3. N. albomarginata × N. clipeata
4. N. albomarginata × N. hirsuta
5. N. albomarginata × N. macrovulgaris
6. N. albomarginata × N. northiana [=N. × cincta]
7. N. albomarginata × N. rafflesiana
8. N. albomarginata × N. reinwardtiana [=N. × ferrugineomarginata] *
9. N. albomarginata × N. veitchii
10. N. ampullaria × N. bicalcarata
11. N. ampullaria × N. gracilis [=N. × trichocarpa] *
12. (N. ampullaria × N. gracilis) × N. bicalcarata [=N. × trichocarpa × N. bicalcarata]
13. N. ampullaria × N. hemsleyana
14. N. ampullaria × N. hirsuta
15. N. ampullaria × N. mirabilis [=N. × kuchingensis, Nepenthes cutinensis] *
16. N. ampullaria × N. rafflesiana [=N. × hookeriana] *
17. ? (N. ampullaria × N. rafflesiana) × N. mirabilis [=N. × hookeriana × N. mirabilis]
18. N. bicalcarata × N. gracilis [=N. × cantleyi]
19. N. bicalcarata × N. mirabilis (including N. bicalcarata × N. mirabilis var. echinostoma)
20. N. bicalcarata × N. rafflesiana
21. ? (N. bicalcarata × N. rafflesiana) × N. mirabilis var. echinostoma
22. N. burbidgeae × N. edwardsiana
23. N. burbidgeae × N. fusca
24. N. burbidgeae × N. rajah [=N. × alisaputrana]
25. N. burbidgeae × N. tentaculata
26. N. chaniana × N. veitchii^{[note a]}
27. N. clipeata × N. rafflesiana
28. N. clipeata × N. reinwardtiana
29. N. edwardsiana × N. rajah
30. N. edwardsiana × N. villosa [=N. × harryana]
31. ? N. faizaliana × N. veitchii
32. N. fusca × N. lowii^{[note b]}
33. N. fusca × N. platychila
34. N. fusca × N. rajah
35. N. fusca × N. reinwardtiana [=?N. naquiyuddinii]
36. N. fusca × N. stenophylla
37. N. fusca × N. tentaculata
38. N. fusca × N. veitchii
39. N. gracilis × N. mirabilis [=N. × sharifah-hapsahii, N. × ghazallyana, N. × grabilis, N. neglecta?] * (including N. gracilis × N. mirabilis var. echinostoma)
40. N. gracilis × N. northiana [=N. × bauensis]
41. N. gracilis × N. rafflesiana *
42. N. gracilis × N. reinwardtiana *
43. N. hemsleyana × N. rafflesiana
44. ? N. hirsuta × N. lowii
45. N. hispida × N. reinwardtiana
46. N. hurrelliana × N. lowii
47. N. hurrelliana × N. veitchii
48. N. lowii × N. macrophylla [=N. × trusmadiensis]
49. N. lowii × N. muluensis
50. N. lowii × N. rajah
51. N. lowii × N. stenophylla
52. ? N. lowii × N. tentaculata
53. N. lowii × N. veitchii
54. N. macrovulgaris × N. rajah
55. N. macrovulgaris × N. reinwartdiana
56. N. macrovulgaris × N. tentaculata
57. N. mirabilis × N. northiana
58. N. mirabilis × N. rafflesiana * (including N. mirabilis var. echinostoma × N. rafflesiana)
59. N. mirabilis × N. reinwardtiana
60. ? N. muluensis × N. tentaculata [=N. × sarawakiensis,?N. muluensis]
61. N. rajah × N. stenophylla
62. N. rajah × N. tentaculata
63. N. rajah × N. villosa [=N × kinabaluensis]
64. N. reinwardtiana × N. stenophylla
65. N. reinwardtiana × N. tentaculata
66. N. stenophylla × N. tentaculata
67. N. stenophylla × N. veitchii

Endemic species with no known natural hybrids:

- N. appendiculata
- N. boschiana
- N. campanulata
- N. ephippiata
- N. epiphytica
- N. glandulifera
- N. mapuluensis
- N. mollis
- N. murudensis
- N. pilosa
- N. vogelii

Nepenthes hurrelliana and N. murudensis are of putative hybrid origin, but are considered species by most taxonomists, as they form stable, fertile populations independent of their original parent species. The same could be said for stable hybrids such as N × kinabaluensis. Indeed, species status has been proposed for this taxon in the past.

=== Sumatra ===
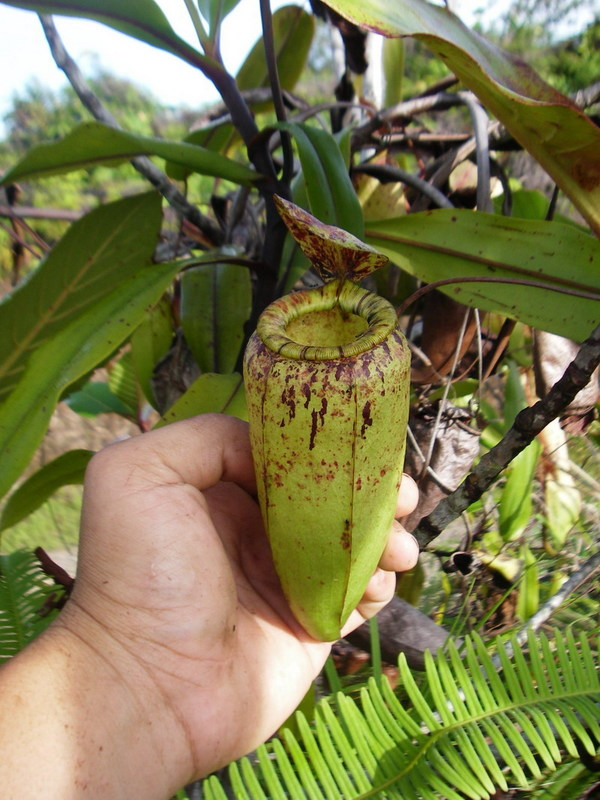
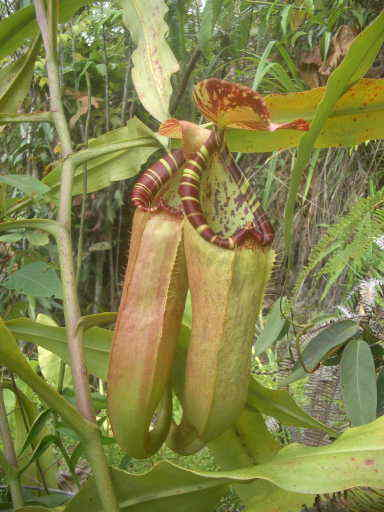
Left: N. ampullaria × N. eustachya
Right: ? N. beccariana × N. sumatrana
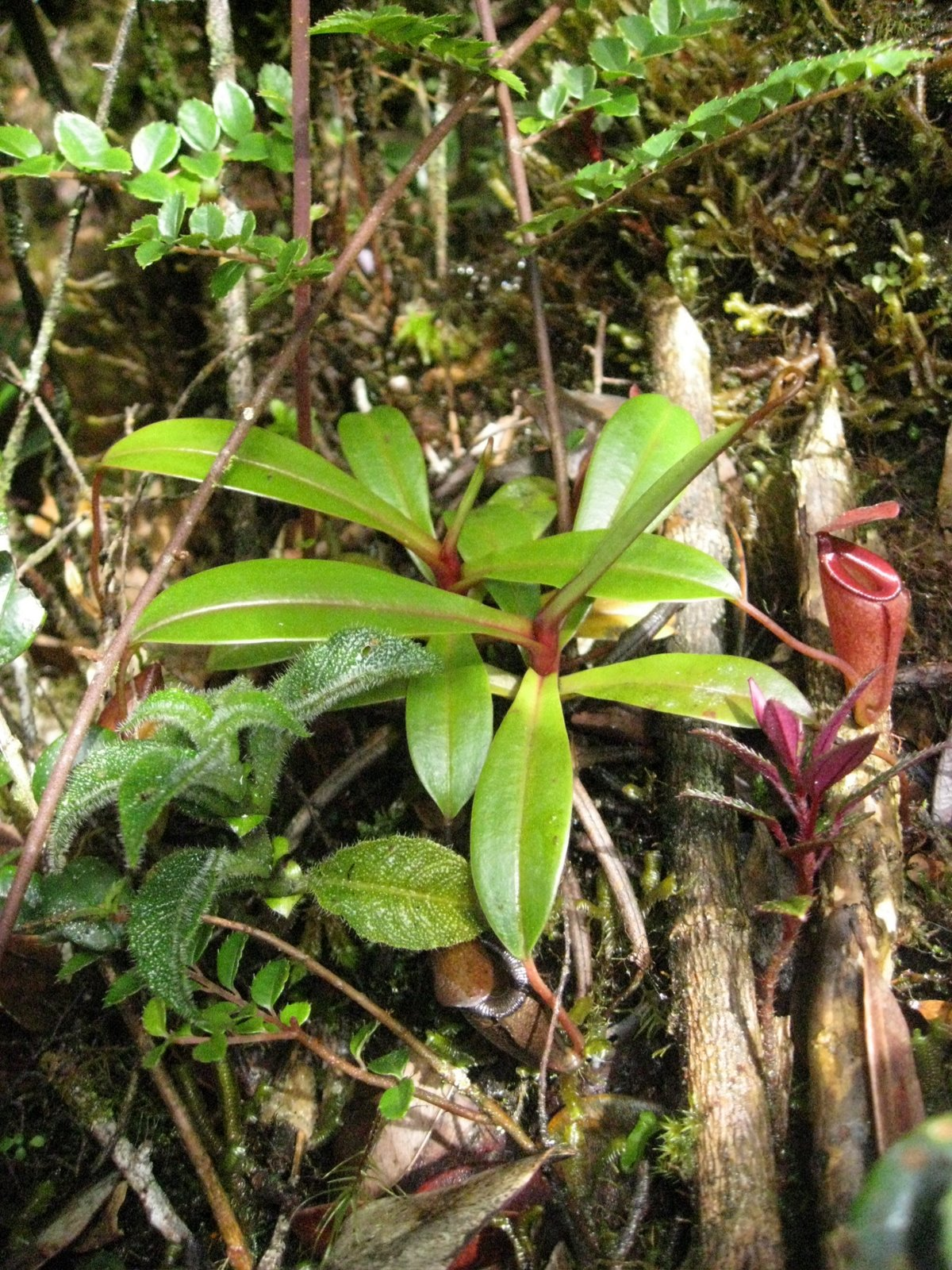
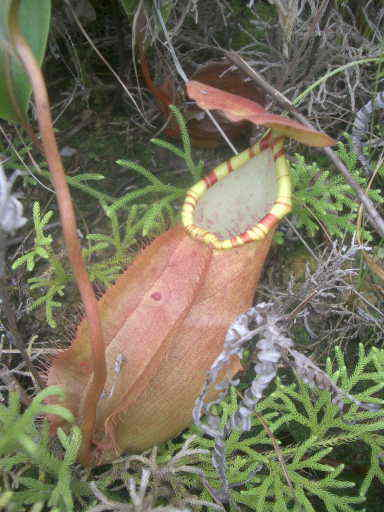
Left: ? N. dubia × N. jacquelineae
Right: N. eustachya × N. sumatrana
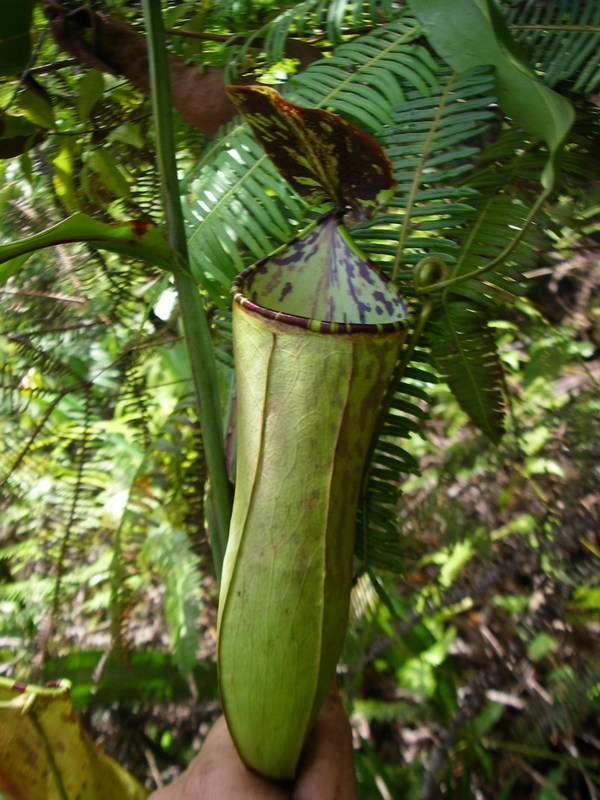
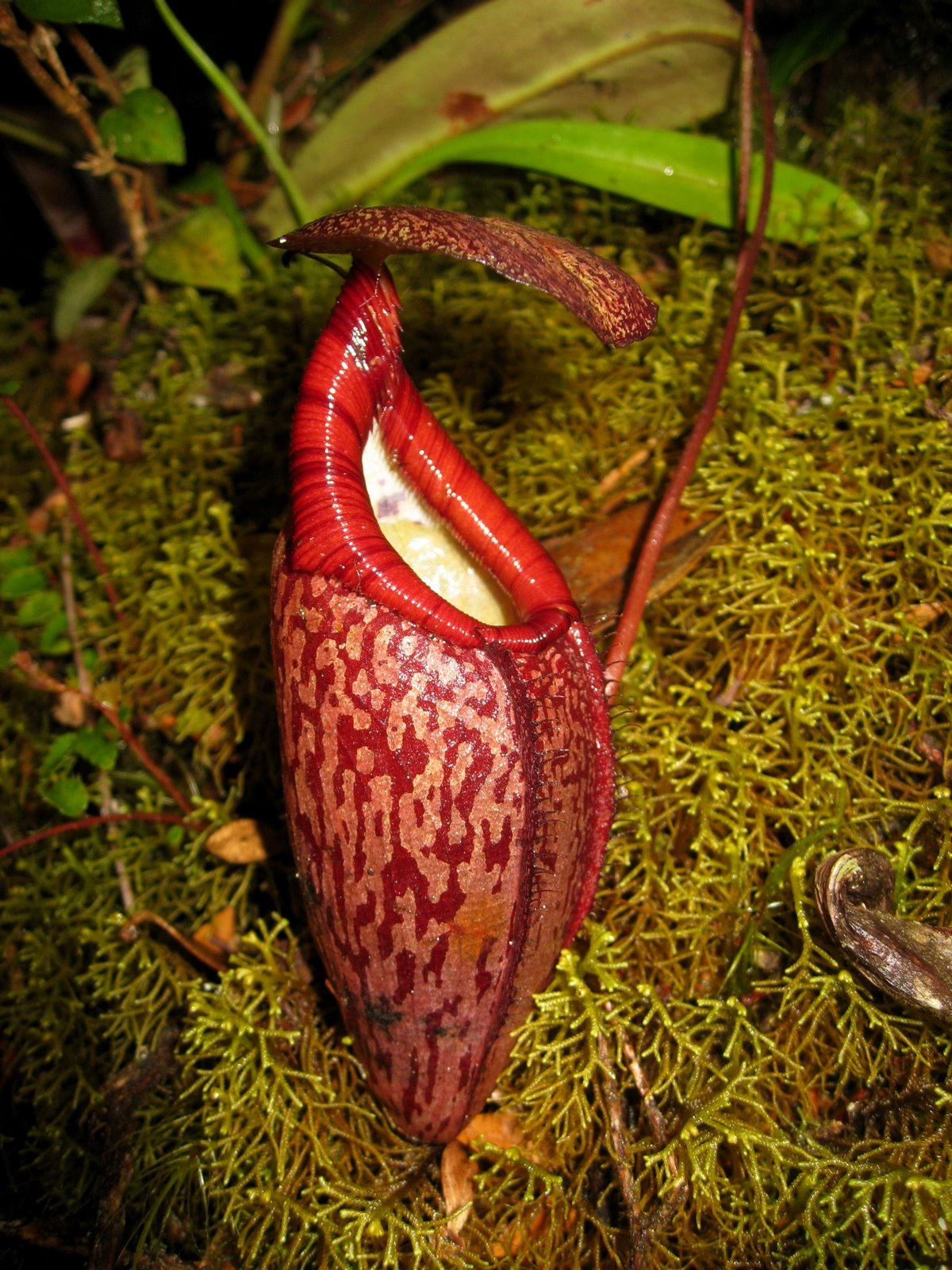
Left: N. gracilis × N. sumatrana
Right: N. gymnamphora × N. spectabilis
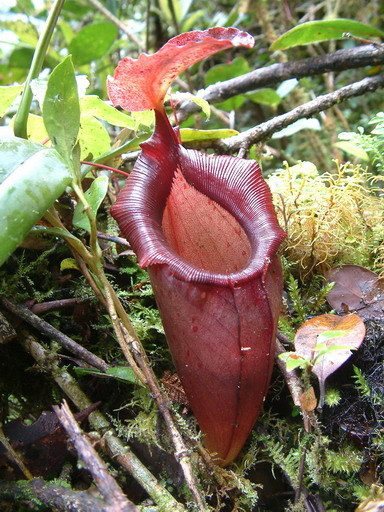
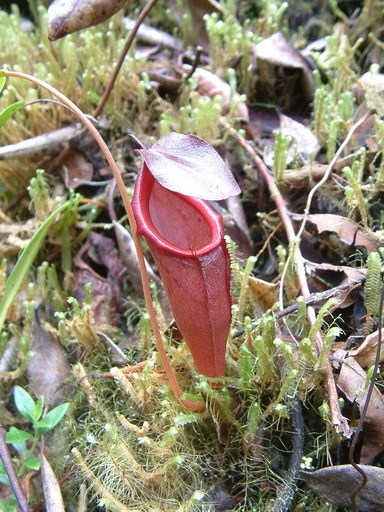
Left: N. izumiae × N. jacquelineae
Right: N. jamban × N. lingulata
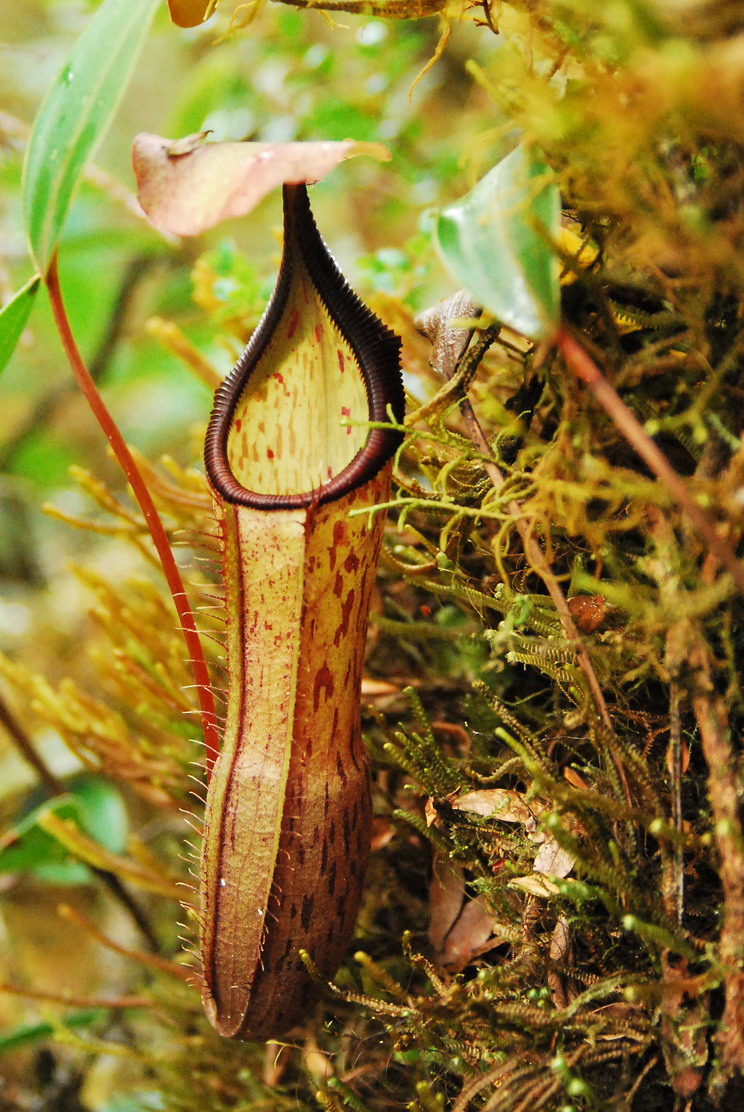
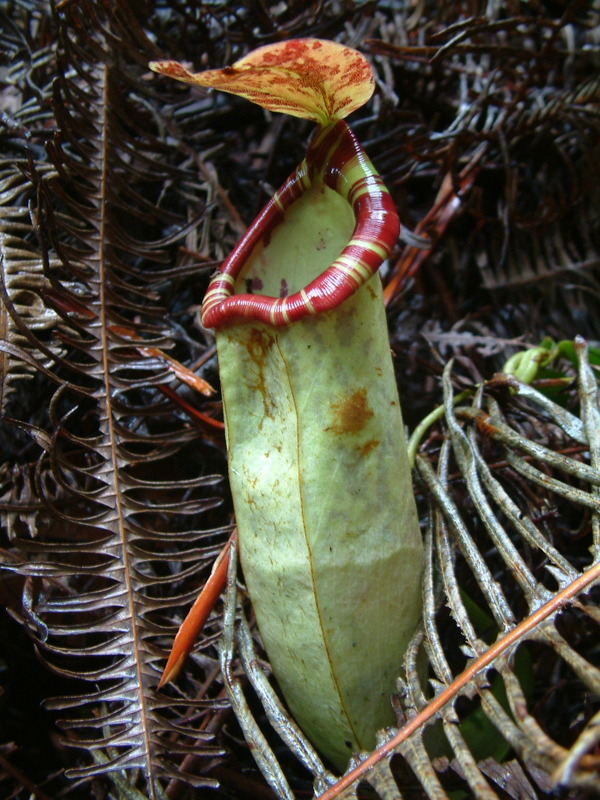
Left: N. mikei × N. ovata
Right: N. mirabilis × N. sumatrana
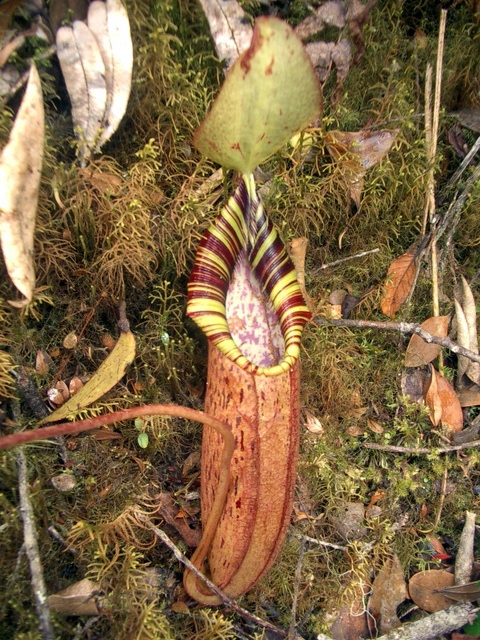
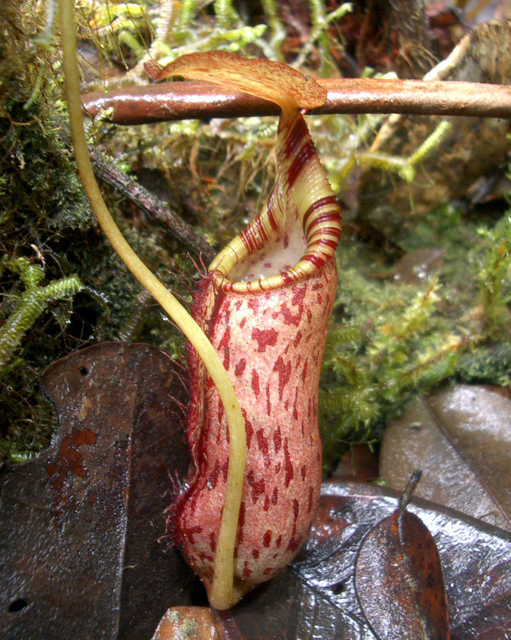
Left: N. ovata × N. spectabilis
Right: N. rhombicaulis × N. spectabilis
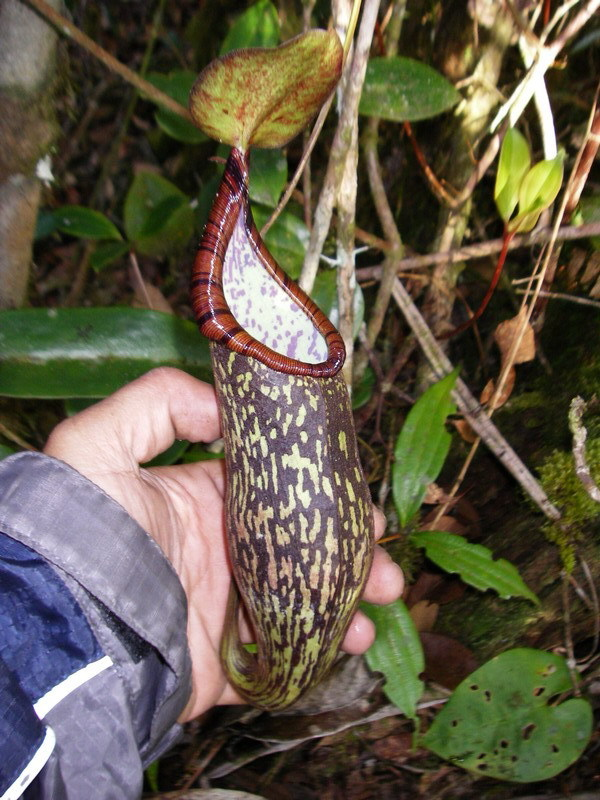
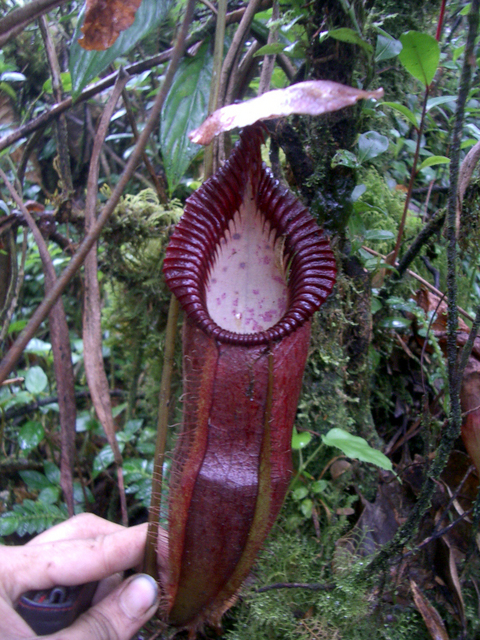
Left: N. rigidifolia × N. spectabilis
Right: ? N. singalana × N. spathulata

Nepenthes natural hybrids recorded from Sumatra.

1. N. albomarginata × N. ampullaria *
2. N. albomarginata × N. eustachya
3. N. albomarginata × N. reinwardtiana [=N. × ferrugineomarginata] *
4. N. ampullaria × N. eustachya
5. N. ampullaria × N. gracilis [=N. × trichocarpa] *
6. N. ampullaria × N. mirabilis [=N. × kuchingensis, Nepenthes cutinensis] *
7. N. ampullaria × N. rafflesiana [=N. × hookeriana] *
8. N. ampullaria × N. reinwardtiana
9. N. ampullaria × N. spathulata
10. N. ampullaria × N. tobaica
11. N. angasanensis × N. densiflora
12. N. aristolochioides × N. singalana
13. ? N. beccariana × N. sumatrana
14. N. bongso × N. gymnamphora
15. N. bongso × N. singalana
16. N. bongso × N. talangensis
17. N. diatas × N. mikei
18. N. dubia × N. izumiae^{[note c]}
19. ? N. dubia × N. jacquelineae
20. ? N. dubia × N. jamban
21. ? N. eustachya × N. gracilis
22. N. eustachya × N. longifolia
23. N. eustachya × N. sumatrana
24. N. flava × N. ovata
25. N. flava × N. rhombicaulis
26. N. gracilis × N. mirabilis [=N. × sharifah-hapsahii, N. × ghazallyana, N. × grabilis, N. neglecta?] *
27. N. gracilis × N. rafflesiana *
28. N. gracilis × N. reinwardtiana *
29. N. gracilis × N. sumatrana
30. N. gymnamphora × N. mikei [=N. × pangulubauensis]
31. N. gymnamphora × N. ovata
32. N. gymnamphora × N. reinwardtiana
33. ? N. gymnamphora × N. rhombicaulis
34. N. gymnamphora × N. singalana
35. N. gymnamphora × N. spathulata
36. N. gymnamphora × N. spectabilis
37. N. gymnamphora × N. talangensis
38. N. inermis × N. singalana
39. N. inermis × N. spathulata
40. N. inermis × N. talangensis [=N. × pyriformis]
41. N. izumiae × N. jacquelineae
42. N. jamban × N. lingulata
43. ? N. longifolia × N. sumatrana
44. N. mikei × N. ovata
45. N. mikei × N. spectabilis
46. N. mirabilis × N. rafflesiana *
47. N. mirabilis × N. spathulata
48. N. mirabilis × N. sumatrana
49. N. ovata × N. rhombicaulis
50. N. ovata × N. spectabilis
51. N. reinwardtiana × N. spathulata
52. N. reinwardtiana × N. tobaica
53. N. rhombicaulis × N. spectabilis
54. N. rhombicaulis × N. tobaica
55. N. rigidifolia × N. spectabilis^{[note d]}
56. ? N. singalana × N. spathulata
57. N. spathulata × N. tobaica
58. N. spectabilis × N. tobaica

Endemic species with no known natural hybrids:

- N. adnata
- N. junghuhnii
- N. lavicola
- N. naga
- N. tenuis

=== Philippines ===
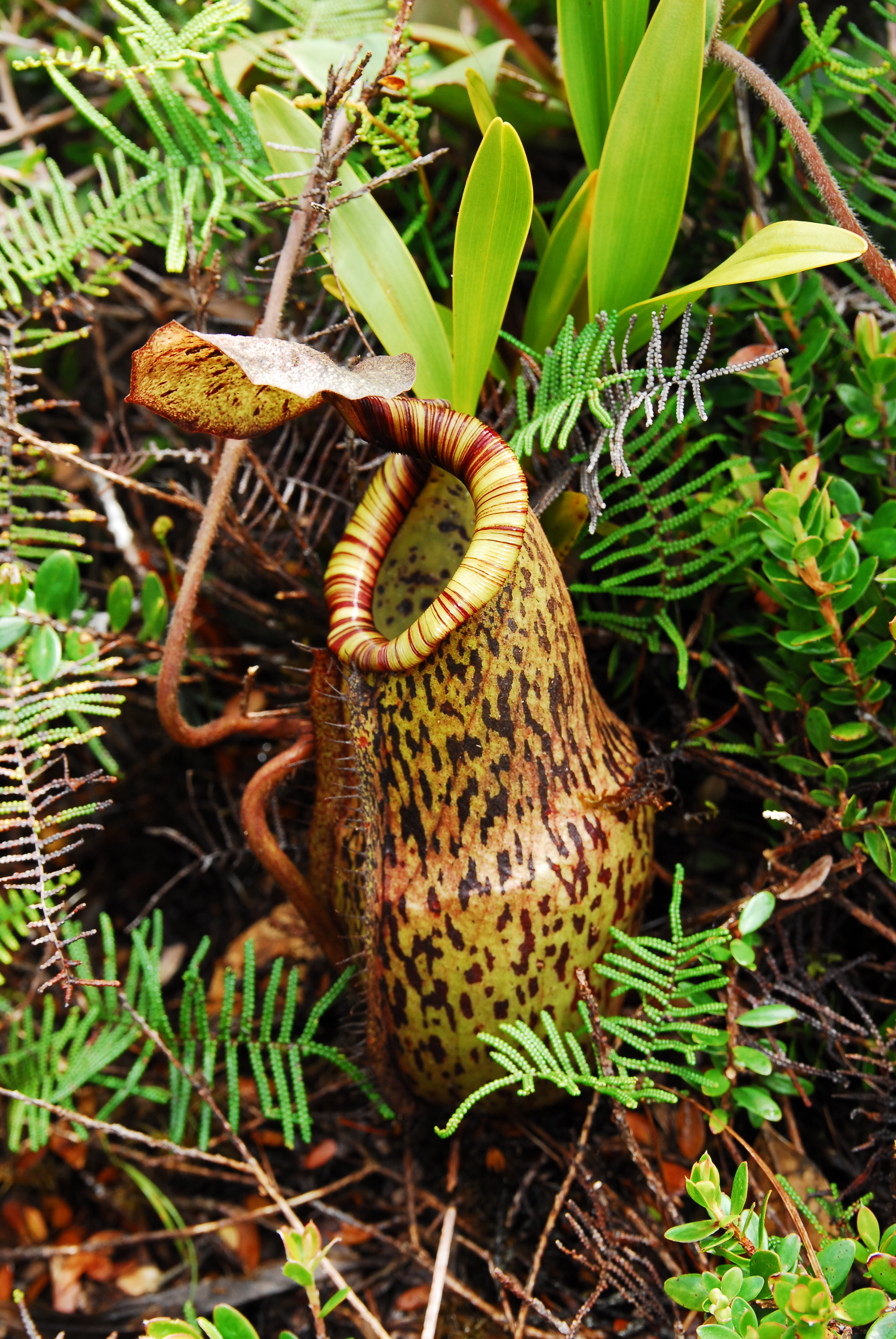
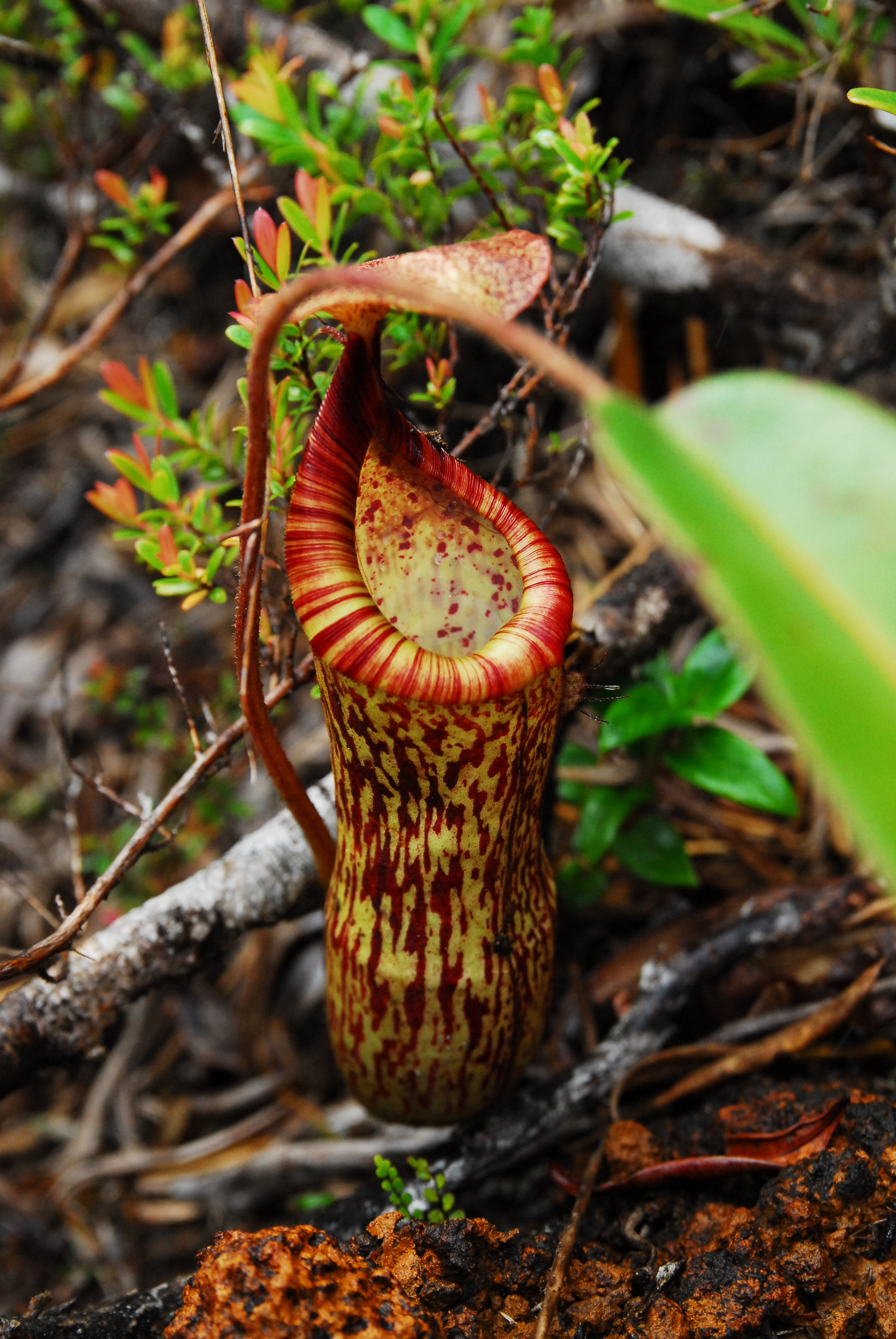
Lower (left) and upper pitchers of putative N. justinae × N. peltata from Mount Hamiguitan, Mindanao
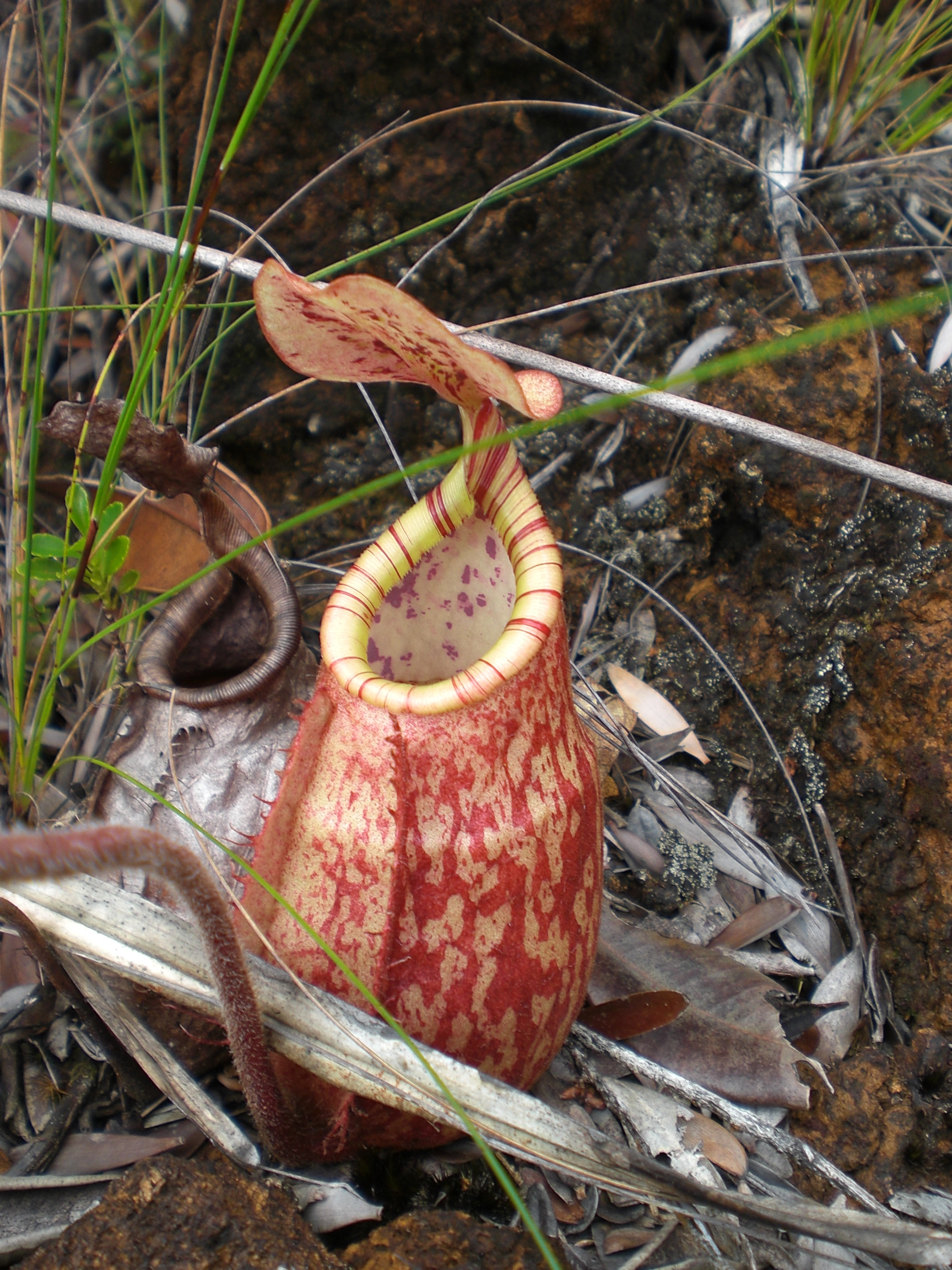
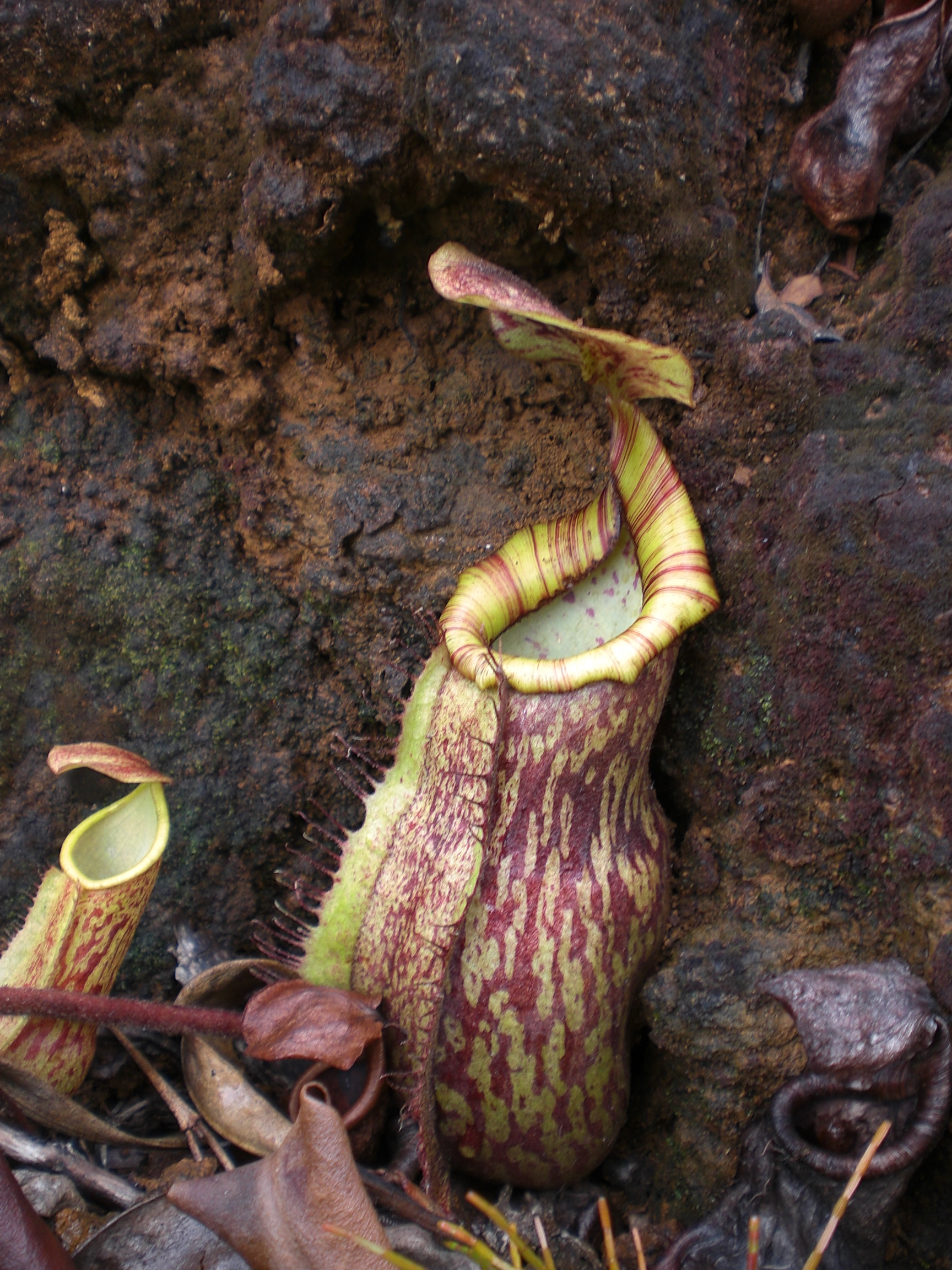
Putative natural hybrids from Mount Hamiguitan
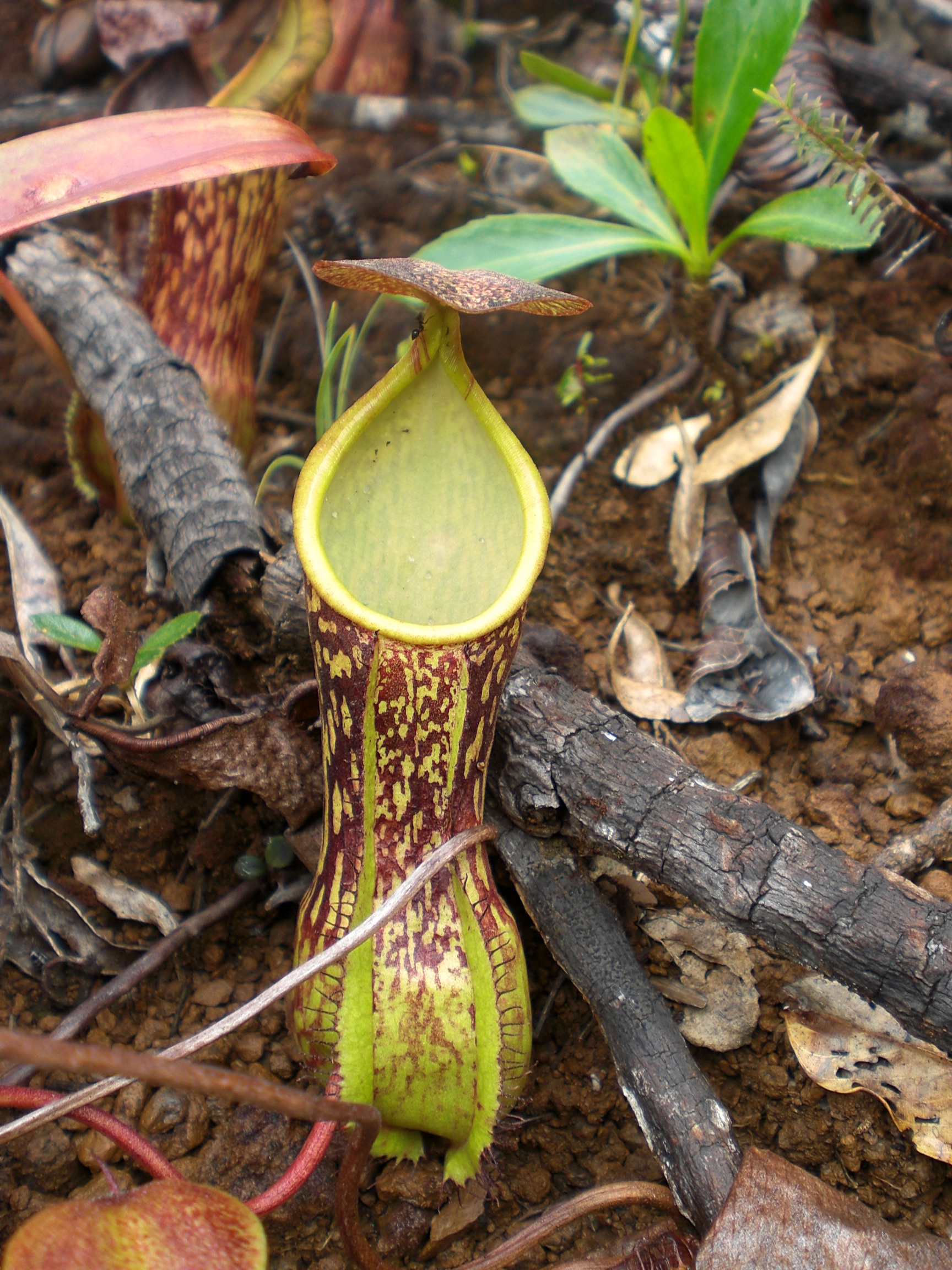
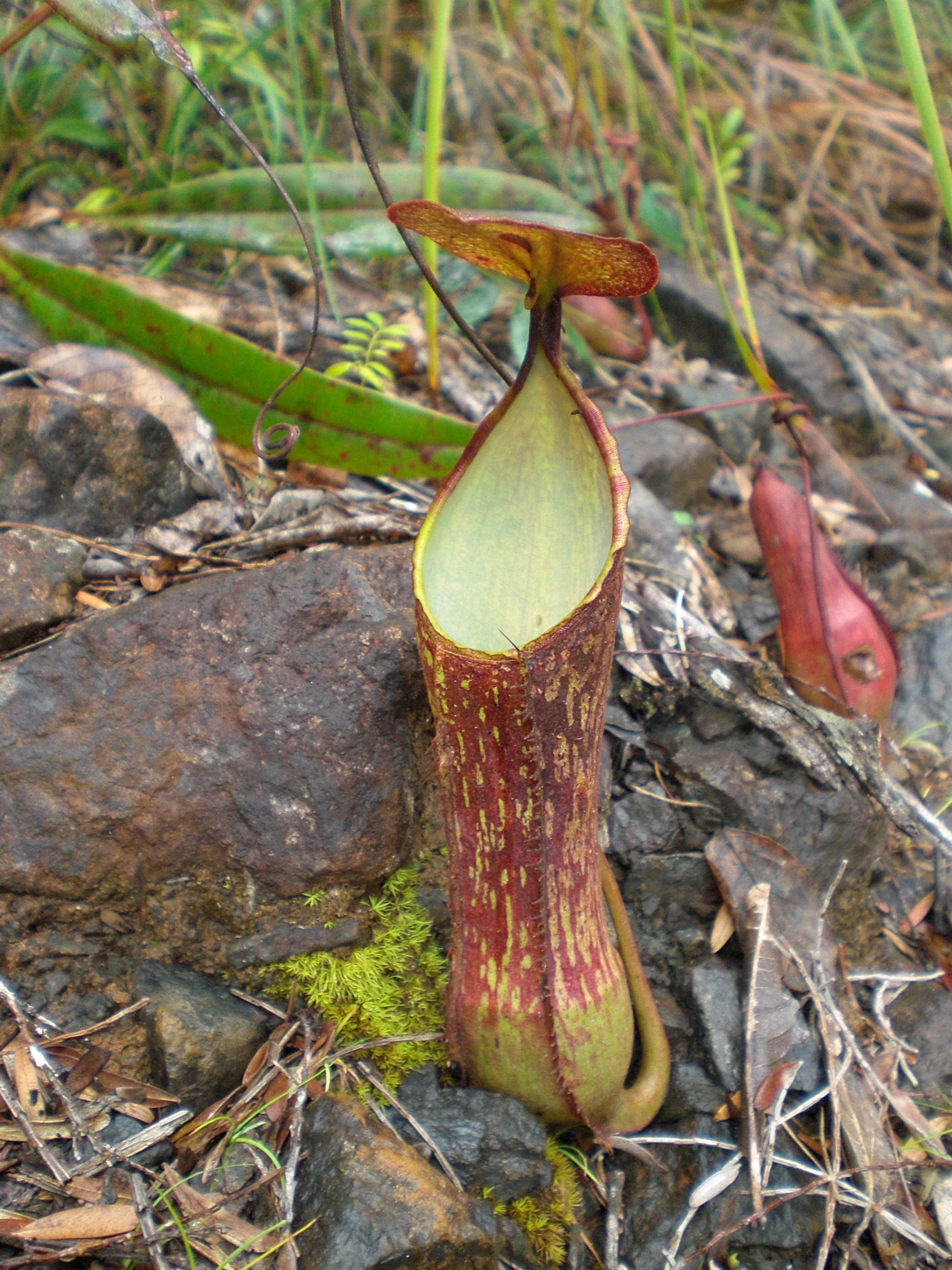
Putative natural hybrids from Mount Hamiguitan

Nepenthes natural hybrids recorded from the Philippines. The N. alata hybrids listed below involve N. alata in the broad sense (sensu lato); this polymorphic taxon has recently been split into a large number of daughter species that now form the so-called "N. alata group".

1. N. alata × N. burkei
2. N. alata × N. merrilliana [=N. × merrilliata]
3. ? (N. alata × N. merrilliana) × N. mirabilis [=N. × tsangoya]
4. N. alata × N. mindanaoensis
5. N. alata × N. mirabilis [=N. × mirabilata]
6. ? N. alata × N. petiolata
7. N. alata × N. pulchra
8. N. alata × N. truncata [=N. × truncalata]
9. N. alata × N. ventricosa [=N. × ventrata]
10. ? N. pantaronensis × N. sumagaya
11. N. bellii × N. merrilliana
12. N. bellii × N. mindanaoensis
13. N. ceciliae × N. pulchra
14. N. merrilliana× N. mindanaoensis
15. N. merrilliana × N. mirabilis
16. N. mindanaoensis × N. truncata
17. N. mindanaoensis × N. erucoides
18. N. palawanensis × N. aff. philippinensis
19. ? N. petiolata × N. truncata

In addition, certain plants from Mount Hamiguitan are likely to represent crosses involving N. hamiguitanensis, N. justinae (previously identified as N. mindanaoensis), N. micramphora, and N. peltata.

Endemic species with no known natural hybrids:

- N. abalata
- N. abgracilis
- N. aenigma
- N. alzapan
- N. argentii
- N. armin
- N. attenboroughii
- N. barcelonae
- N. cid
- N. copelandii
- N. cornuta
- N. deaniana
- N. extincta
- N. gantungensis
- N. graciliflora
- N. halmahera
- N. kitanglad
- N. leonardoi
- N. leyte
- N. mantalingajanensis
- N. mira
- N. negros
- N. philippinensis
- N. ramos
- N. robcantleyi
- N. samar
- N. saranganiensis
- N. sibuyanensis
- N. surigaoensis
- N. talaandig
- N. tboli
- N. ultra
- N. viridis
- N. weda
- N. zygon
- N. sp. Anipahan

Nepenthes petiolata may itself have evolved from a cross between N. alata and N. truncata. It has been suggested that N. extincta might represent a natural hybrid between N. merrilliana and N. mindanaoensis, as both of these species grow near the type locality of N. extincta and share many morphological features with it.

Plants from Mount Hamiguitan that were originally thought to represent the natural hybrid N. micramphora × N. peltata are now recognised as belonging to a distinct species of possible hybridogenic origin, N. hamiguitanensis.

=== Peninsular Malaysia and Singapore ===
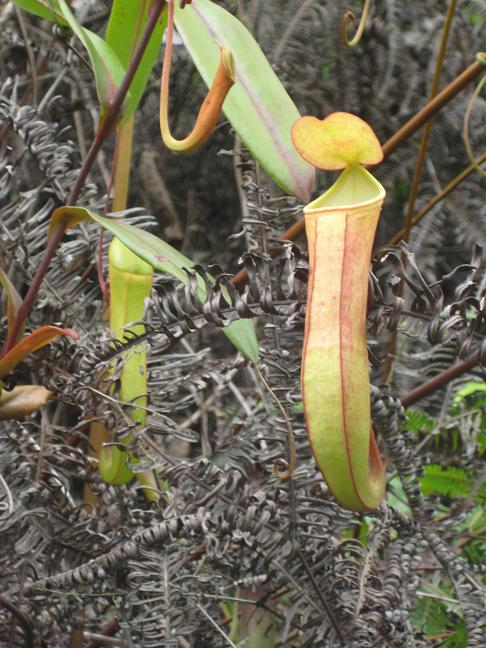
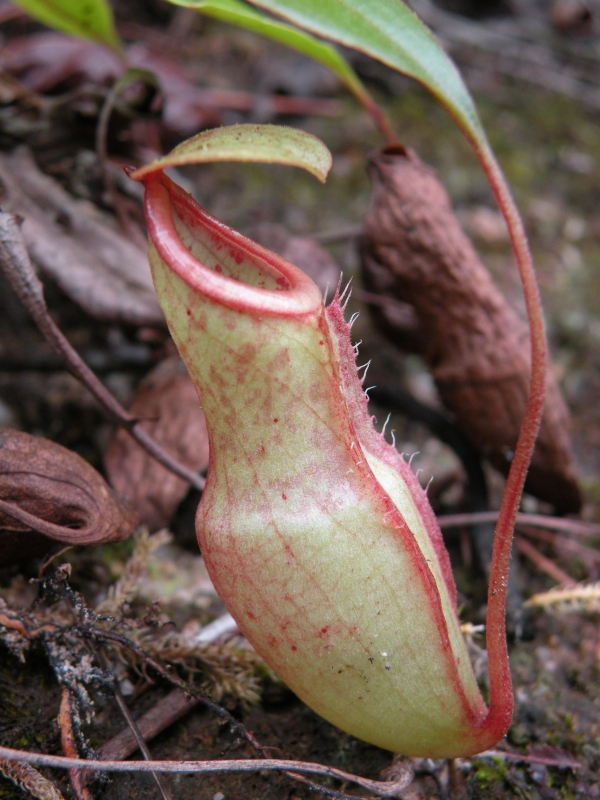
Left: N. albomarginata × N. gracilis
Right: N. benstonei × N. mirabilis

Nepenthes natural hybrids recorded from Peninsular Malaysia and Singapore.

1. N. albomarginata × N. ampullaria *
2. N. albomarginata × N. gracilis
3. ? N. albomarginata × N. sanguinea
4. N. ampullaria × N. gracilis [=N. × trichocarpa] *
5. N. ampullaria × N. mirabilis [=N. × kuchingensis, Nepenthes cutinensis] *
6. N. ampullaria × N. rafflesiana [=N. × hookeriana] *
7. N. benstonei × N. mirabilis
8. N. benstonei x N. rafflesiana
9. N. gracilis × N. mirabilis [=N. × sharifah-hapsahii, N. × ghazallyana, N. × grabilis, N. neglecta?] *
10. N. macfarlanei × N. ramispina
11. N. macfarlanei × N. sanguinea
12. N. mirabilis × N. rafflesiana *
13. N. ramispina × N. sanguinea

Two natural hybrids have been recorded from Singapore: N. × hookeriana and N. × trichocarpa. As such, all three species from Singapore are known to hybridise.

=== Sulawesi ===
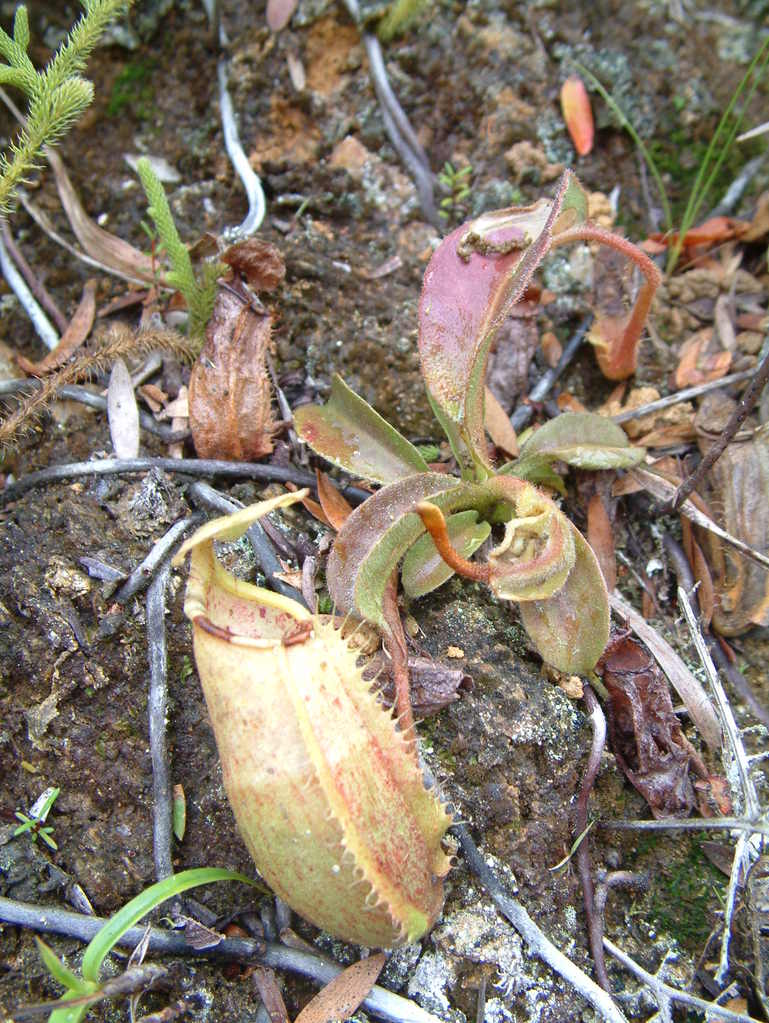
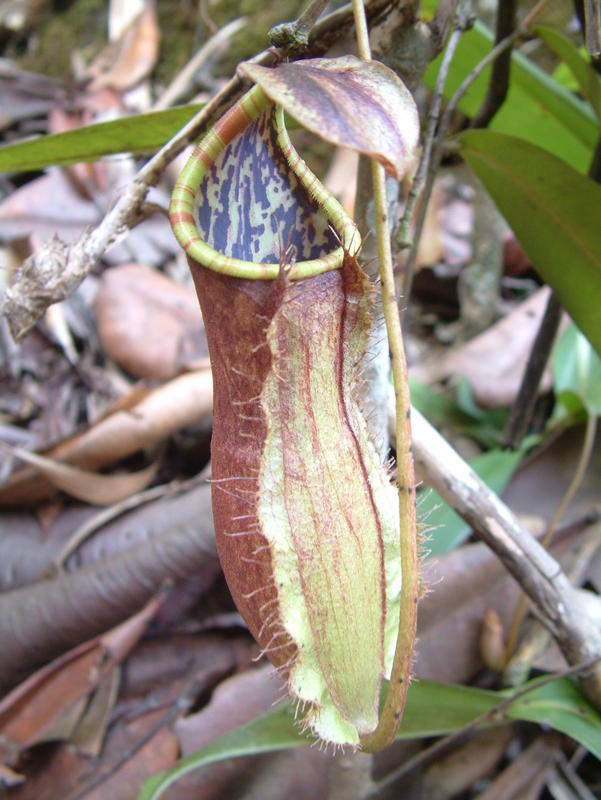
Left: N. glabrata × N. maxima
Right: N. mirabilis × N. tomoriana

Nepenthes natural hybrids recorded from Sulawesi.

1. ? N. eymae × N. maxima
2. N. glabrata × N. hamata
3. N. glabrata × N. maxima
4. N. glabrata × N. nigra
5. N. glabrata × N. tentaculata
6. N. hamata × N. tentaculata
7. N. maxima × N. tentaculata
8. N. mirabilis × N. tomoriana
9. N. nigra × N. tentaculata
10. N. pitopangii × N. tentaculata

Endemic species with no known natural hybrids:

- N. diabolica
- N. maryae
- N. undulatifolia

=== Indochina ===
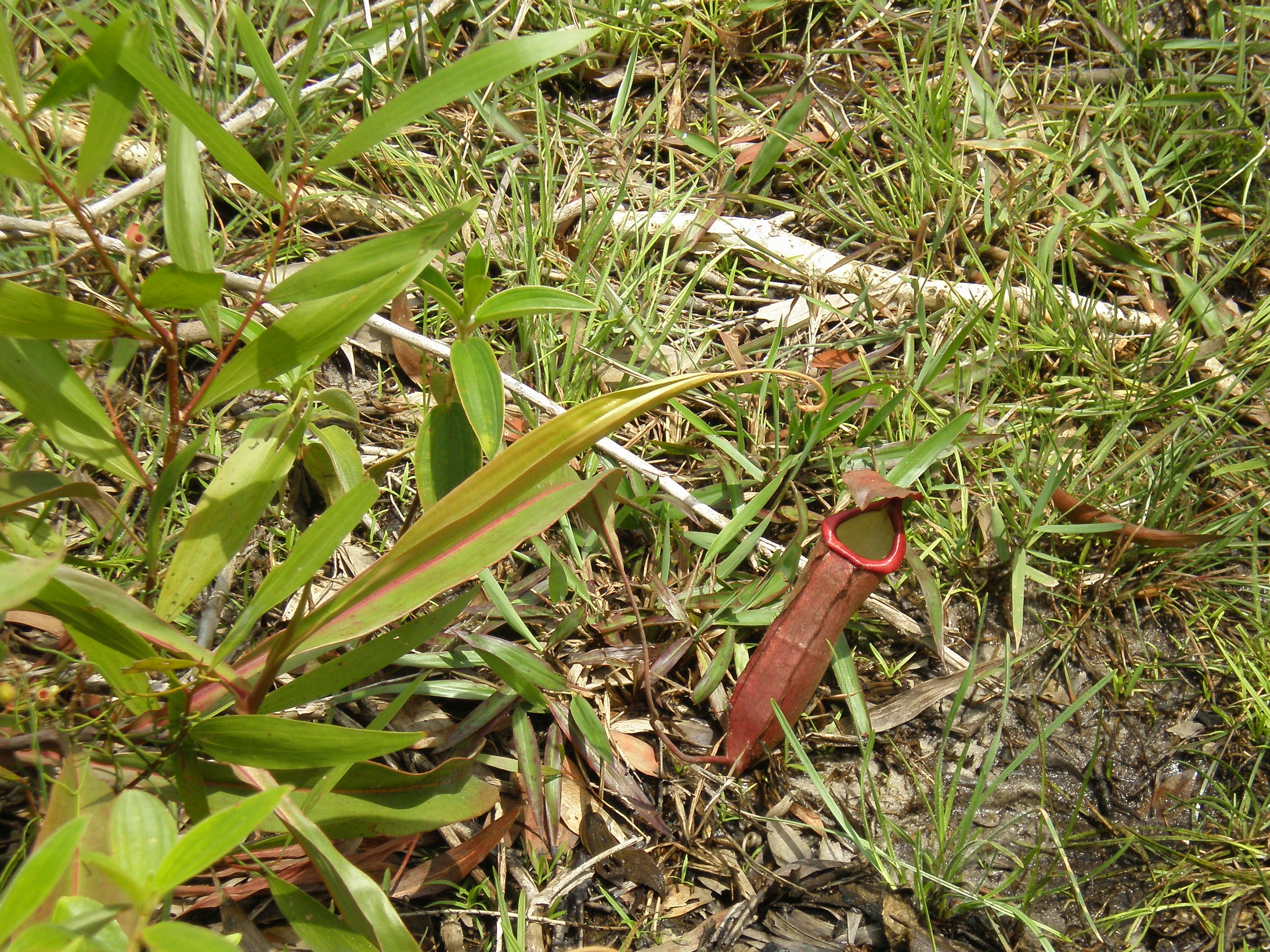
? N. mirabilis × N. thorelii

Nepenthes natural hybrids recorded from Indochina. For the purpose of this list, the area encompasses Cambodia, Laos, Myanmar, Thailand, and Vietnam.

1. N. ampullaria × N. gracilis [=N. × trichocarpa] *
2. N. ampullaria × N. mirabilis [=N. × kuchingensis, Nepenthes cutinensis] *
3. N. andamana × N. mirabilis (including N. andamana × N. mirabilis var. globosa)
4. N. bokorensis × N. kampotiana
5. N. gracilis × N. mirabilis [=N. × sharifah-hapsahii, N. × ghazallyana, N. × grabilis, N. neglecta?] *
6. N. kampotiana × N. mirabilis
7. N. kongkandana × N. mirabilis
8. N. mirabilis × N. smilesii
9. N. mirabilis × N. thorelii

In addition, infraspecific hybrids between N. mirabilis var. globosa and N. mirabilis var. mirabilis are known to occur.

Endemic species with no known natural hybrids:

- N. bokorensis
- N. chang
- N. holdenii
- N. kerrii
- N. rosea
- N. suratensis
- N. thai

=== New Guinea and the Maluku Islands ===
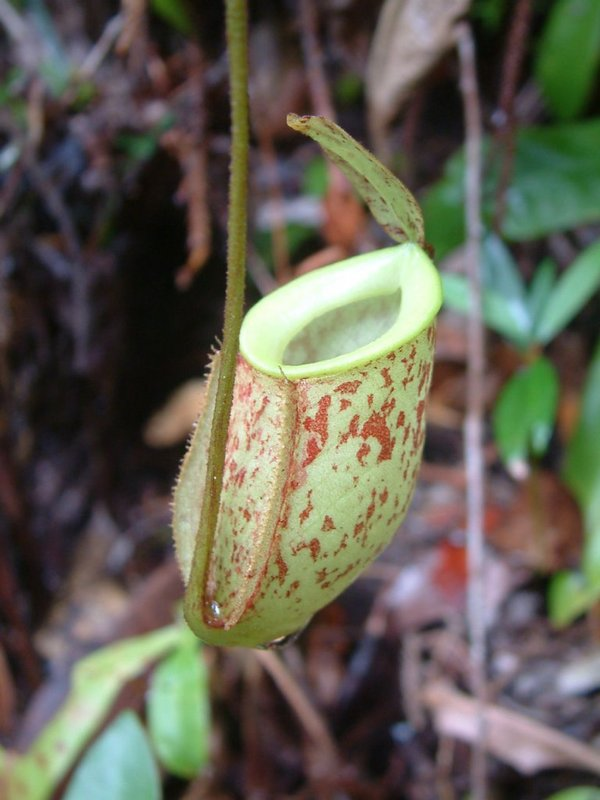
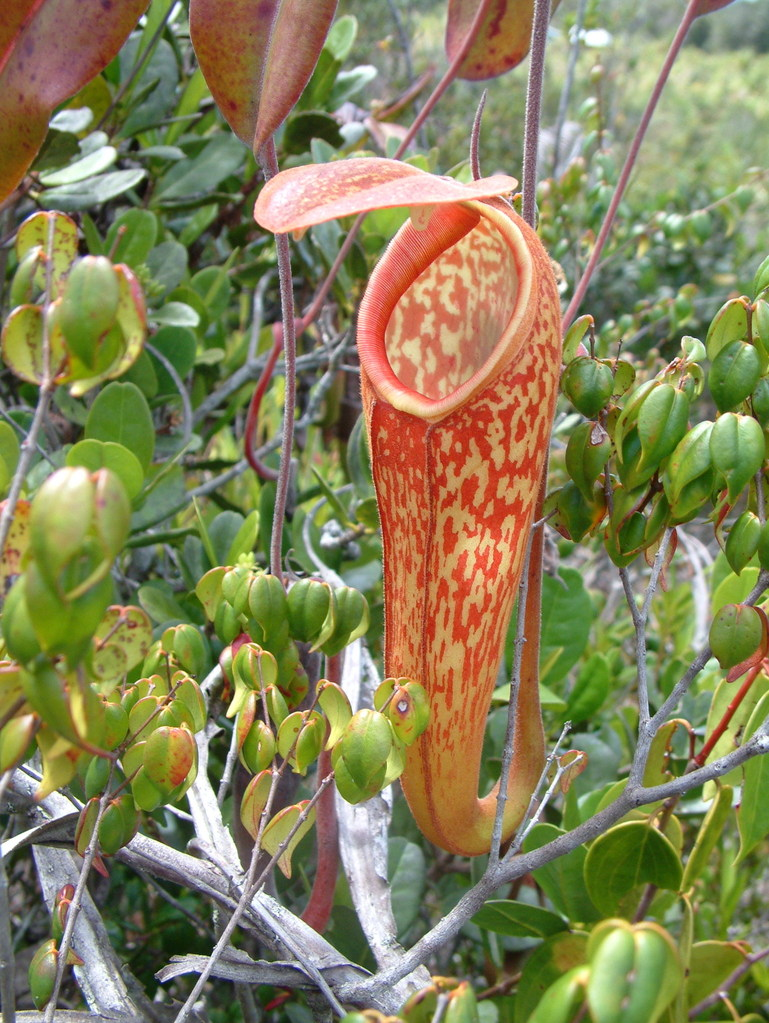
Left: N. ampullaria × N. neoguineensis
Right: N. klossii × N. maxima
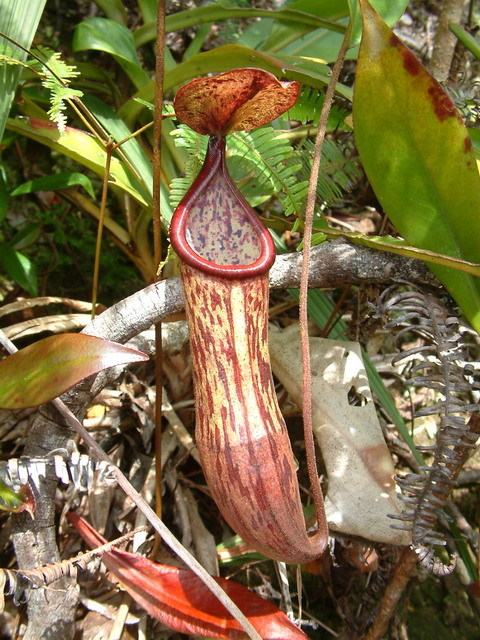
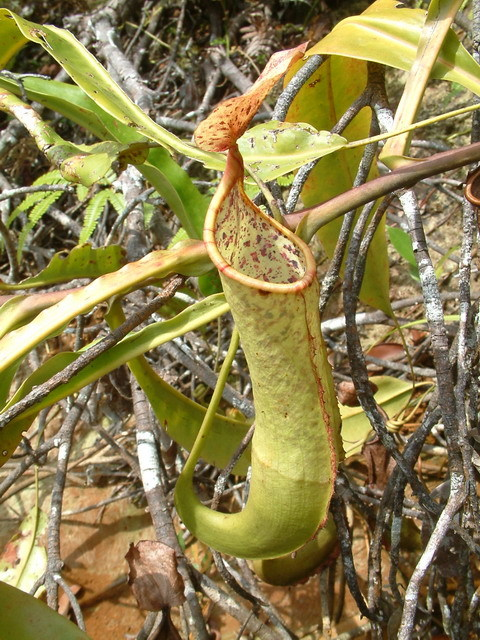
A lower pitcher (left) and an upper pitcher (right) of
N. maxima × N. neoguineensis

Nepenthes natural hybrids recorded from New Guinea, the Maluku Islands, and surrounding islands.

1. N. ampullaria × N. mirabilis [=N. × kuchingensis, Nepenthes cutinensis] *
2. N. ampullaria × N. neoguineensis
3. N. insignis × N. mirabilis
4. N. klossii × N. maxima
5. N. maxima × N. neoguineensis
6. ? N. paniculata × N. papuana

Endemic species with no known natural hybrids:

- N. biak
- N. danseri
- N. lamii
- N. monticola
- N. treubiana
- N. sp. Misool

=== Australia ===
Nepenthes natural hybrids recorded from Australia.

1. N. mirabilis × N. rowaniae
2. N. mirabilis × N. tenax
3. N. rowaniae × N. tenax

Complex hybrids involving all three species are also common.

All three species from Australia are known to hybridise.

=== Outlying areas ===
There are six additional species endemic to areas other than those listed above. These are:

- N. distillatoria (Sri Lanka)
- N. khasiana (India)
- N. madagascariensis (Madagascar)
- N. masoalensis (Madagascar)
- N. pervillei (Seychelles)
- N. vieillardii (New Caledonia)

Of these, the only species that could conceivably hybridise in the wild are N. madagascariensis and N. masoalensis. Although the ranges of the two species used to meet near Cape Masoala, no natural hybrids have ever been recorded.

== See also ==
- List of Nepenthes species
- List of Nepenthes species by distribution

== Notes ==
a. Identified as N. pilosa × N. veitchii in Nepenthes of Borneo.
b. Identified as N. lowii × N. pilosa in Nepenthes of Borneo.
c. Identified as N. dubia × N. singalana in Nepenthes of Sumatra and Peninsular Malaysia.
d. Identified as N. spectabilis × N. species A in Nepenthes of Sumatra and Peninsular Malaysia.
