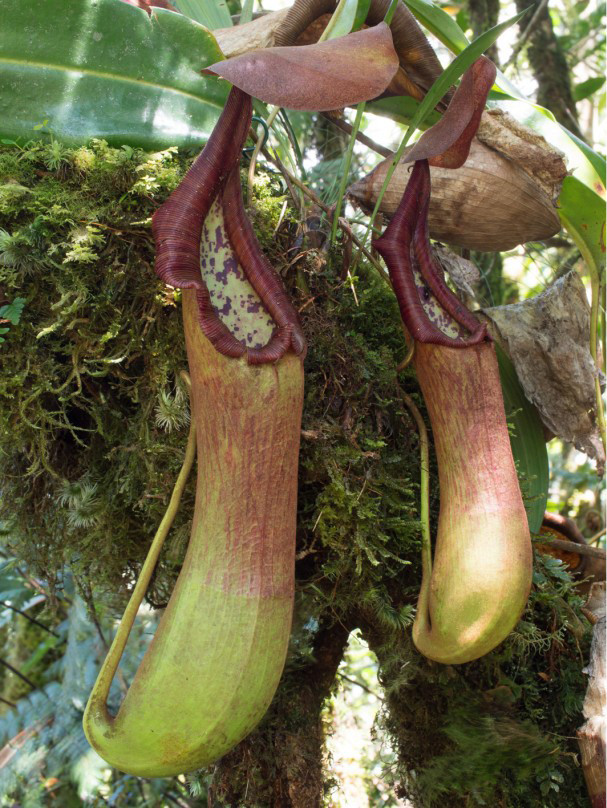

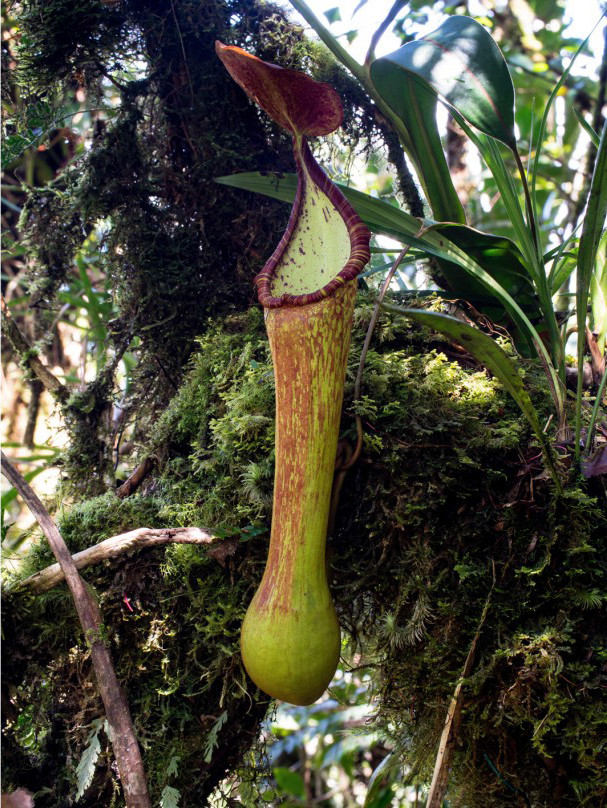
- Lower pitchers (top) and an upper pitcher from the type locality

Conservation status
- Least Concern (IUCN 3.1)

Scientific classification
- Kingdom: Plantae
- Clade: Tracheophytes
- Clade: Angiosperms
- Clade: Eudicots
- Order: Caryophyllales
- Family: Nepenthaceae
- Genus: Nepenthes
- Species: N. pantaronensis

Binomial name
- Nepenthes pantaronensis Gieray, Gronem., Wistuba, Marwinski, Micheler, Coritico & V.B.Amoroso (2014)

= Nepenthes pantaronensis =

Species of pitcher plant from the Philippines

Nepenthes pantaronensis is a tropical pitcher plant native to the Philippines. It is known only from Mount Sumagaya and the Pantaron Mountain Range of central Mindanao, where it grows in lower and upper montane forest. On Mount Sumagaya it is sympatric with N. sumagaya and possible hybrids between these species have been recorded. Nepenthes pantaronensis is closely allied to N. petiolata and N. pulchra, both also from Mindanao.

== Etymology ==
The specific epithet pantaronensis refers to the Pantaron Mountain Range, where the species was discovered.

== Botanical History ==
The discovery and recognition of this taxon as a new species was announced online in September 2012, under the placeholder name "Nepenthes species 5".
