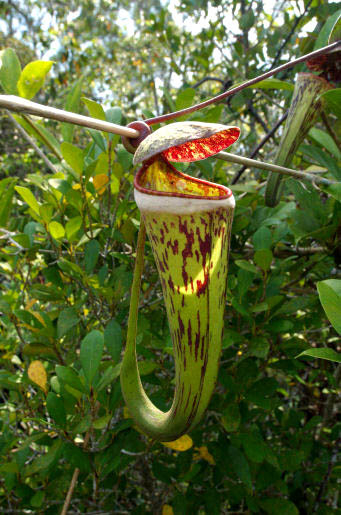
- Upper pitcher of mature plant

Scientific classification
- Kingdom: Plantae
- Clade: Tracheophytes
- Clade: Angiosperms
- Clade: Eudicots
- Order: Caryophyllales
- Family: Nepenthaceae
- Genus: Nepenthes
- Species: N. × cincta

Binomial name
- Nepenthes × cincta Mast. (1884)

= Nepenthes × cincta =

Species of carnivorous plant

Nepenthes × cincta (/nɪˈpɛnθiːz ˈsɪŋktə/; from Latin cinctus "girdled") is a natural hybrid between N. albomarginata and N. northiana.

Nepenthes × cincta is a rare plant and, due to the localised distribution of N. northiana, only grows at a few sites in Bau, Sarawak, usually on a substrate of limestone. N. × cincta is one of only three known natural hybrids involving N. northiana, the others being N. × bauensis and a cross with N. mirabilis.

The traits of N. albomarginata are very dominant in this hybrid; the wide flared peristome of its larger parent species (N. northiana) is almost completely lost. Pitchers are narrowly infundibulate (funnel-shaped) throughout and range in colouration from cream to dusky purple with red or black spots.
