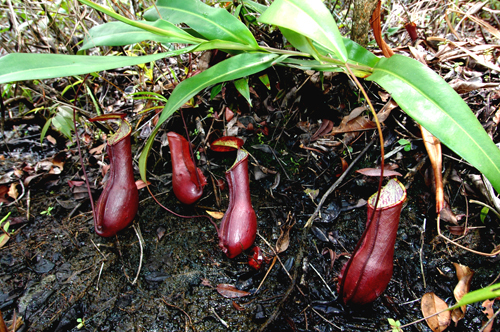
- Young plant with lower pitchers

Scientific classification
- Kingdom: Plantae
- Clade: Tracheophytes
- Clade: Angiosperms
- Clade: Eudicots
- Order: Caryophyllales
- Family: Nepenthaceae
- Genus: Nepenthes
- Species: N. × bauensis

Binomial name
- Nepenthes × bauensis Chi.C.Lee (2004)

= Nepenthes × bauensis =

Species of carnivorous plant

Nepenthes × bauensis (/nɪˈpɛnθiːz baʊˈɛnsɪs/; after Bau, Sarawak) is a natural hybrid involving N. gracilis and N. northiana.

Nepenthes × bauensis is intermediate in appearance between its two parent species. It displays the clumping habit and vine growth of N. gracilis, but can be distinguished from that species on the basis of its larger leaves and stems. The influence of N. northiana is most obvious in the pitcher morphology. In particular, the peristome is wider than in N. gracilis and has scattered red bands. Pitchers are up to 15 cm high and may be pale green to purplish-red in colour.

Like its parent species, N. × bauensis is a lowland plant that grows at an elevation of around 100 m. It is terrestrial in nature and inhabits swampy areas surrounding the limestone hills to which N. northiana is endemic.

This hybrid appears to be very rare and only a few plants have been found. It is known from a single location. N. × bauensis is one of only three known natural hybrids involving N. northiana, the others being N. × cincta and a cross with N. mirabilis.

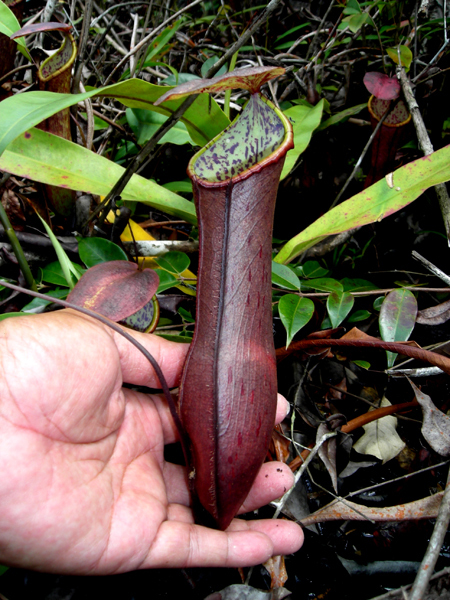
Lower pitcher

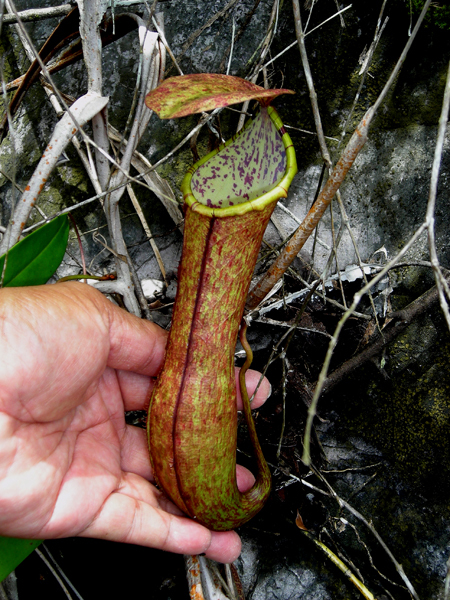
Upper pitcher
