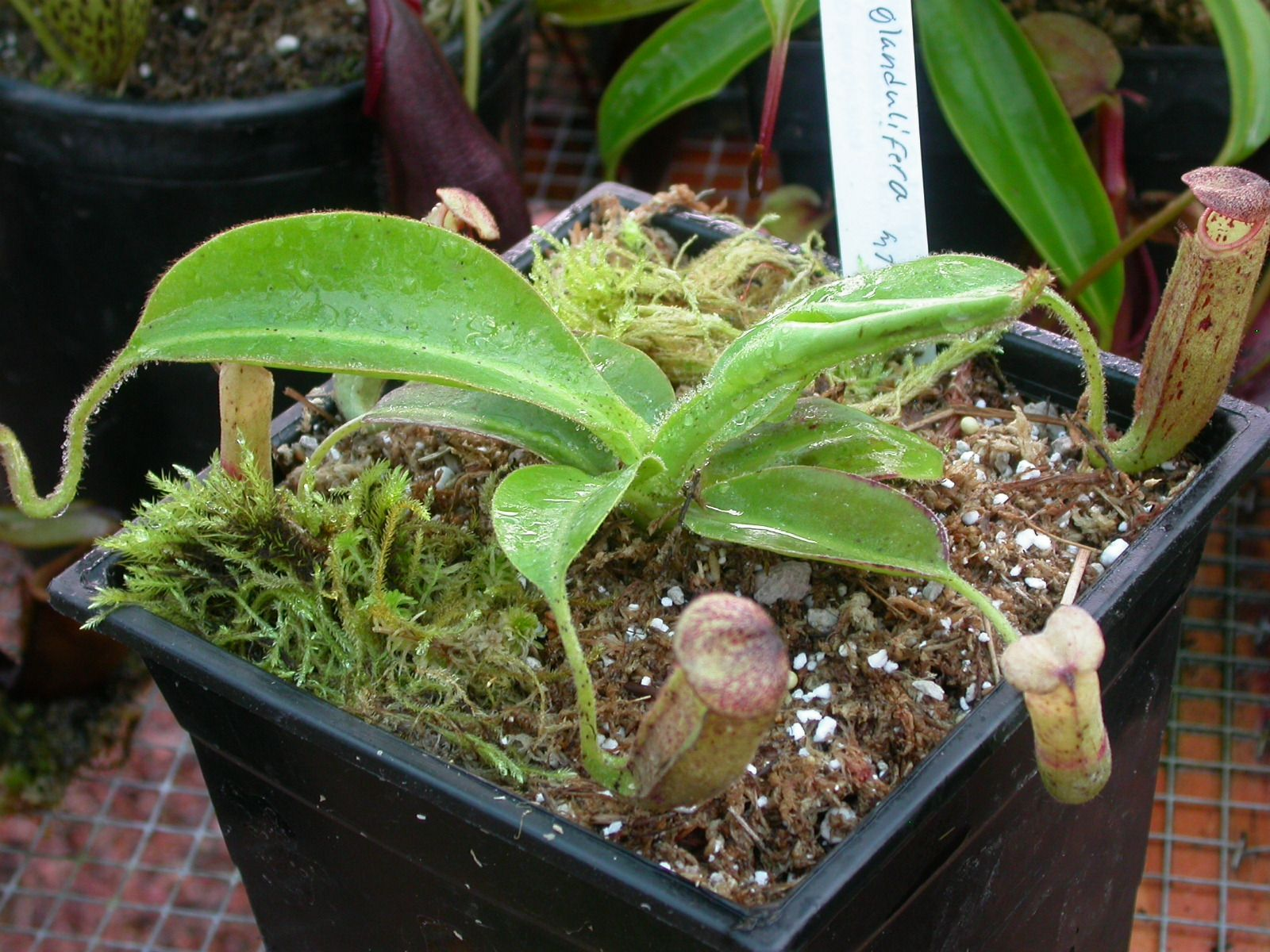

Scientific classification
- Kingdom: Plantae
- Clade: Tracheophytes
- Clade: Angiosperms
- Clade: Eudicots
- Order: Caryophyllales
- Family: Nepenthaceae
- Genus: Nepenthes
- Species: N. glandulifera

Binomial name
- Nepenthes glandulifera Chi.C.Lee (2004)
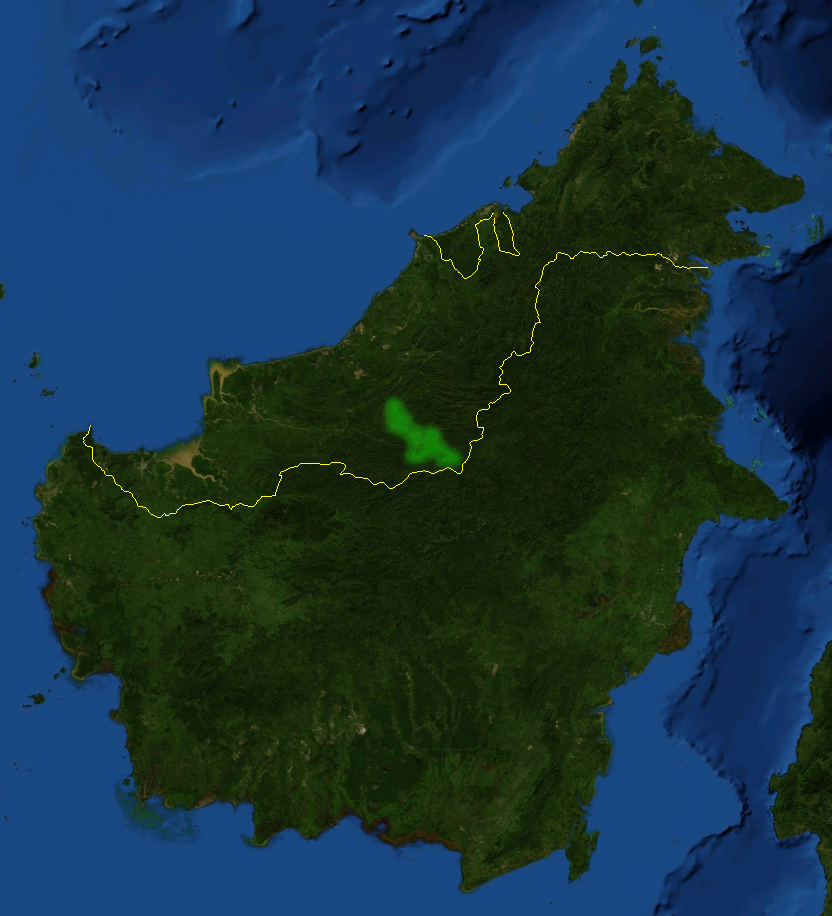
- Distribution of N. glandulifera.

Synonyms
- Informal names: Nepenthes sp. 'A' Chi.C.Lee (2002)

= Nepenthes glandulifera =

Species of pitcher plant from Borneo

Nepenthes glandulifera (/nɪˈpɛnθiːz ˌɡlændjʊˈlɪfərə/; from Latin glandula “gland" and ferre "to bear") is a species of pitcher plant endemic to the Hose Mountains of central Sarawak. This plant is so named for the black speckles around the petioles. The species's discoverer, Ch'ien Lee, initially thought they were a sign of disease. After further investigation, it was realised that the black speckles were actually nectar glands. The species is also notable for having a very prominent indumentum. It appears to be closely related to N. pilosa. Nepenthes glandulifera is not known to form natural hybrids with any other species.

Nepenthes glandulifera was included in a 2002 report on the Nepenthes of the Hose Mountains under the placeholder name Nepenthes sp. 'A'.
