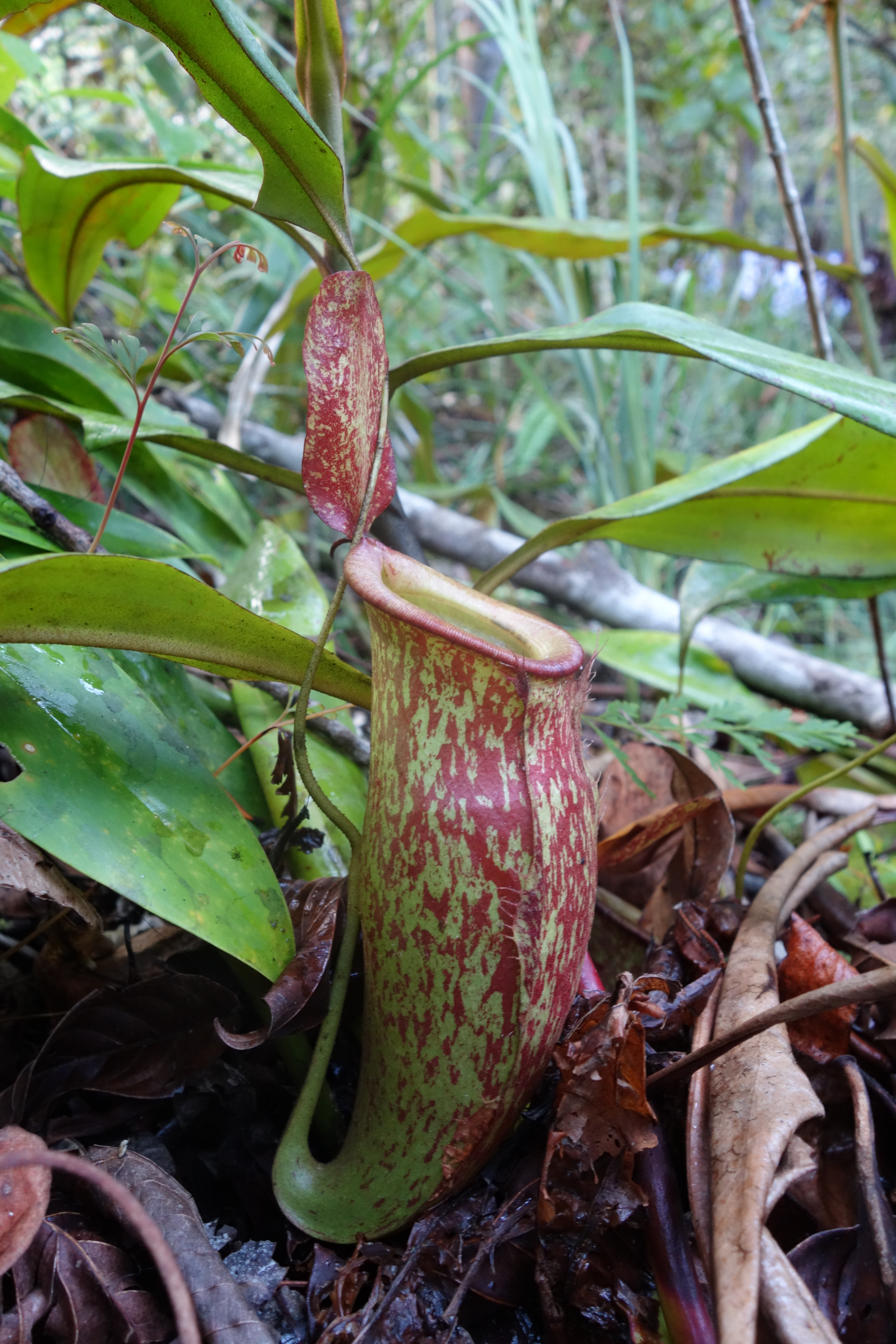
- A typical upper pitcher from the Beneraf region of Western New Guinea

Scientific classification
- Kingdom: Plantae
- Clade: Tracheophytes
- Clade: Angiosperms
- Clade: Eudicots
- Order: Caryophyllales
- Family: Nepenthaceae
- Genus: Nepenthes
- Species: N. × kuchingensis

Binomial name
- Nepenthes × kuchingensis Sh.Kurata (1982)

Synonyms
- Nepenthes cutinensis Hort. ex Lauffenburger (1995) nom. nud.

= Nepenthes × kuchingensis =

Species of carnivorous plant

Nepenthes × kuchingensis (/nɪˈpɛnθiːz ˌkuːtʃɪŋˈɛnsɪs/ nih-PEN-theez KOO-ching-EN-siss) is a natural hybrid between N. ampullaria and N. mirabilis. Although it is named after the city of Kuching in Sarawak, this plant has a wide distribution across Borneo, New Guinea, Peninsular Malaysia, Sumatra, and Thailand.
