= Nepenthes × mirabilata =

Scientific classification
- Kingdom: Plantae
- Clade: Tracheophytes
- Clade: Angiosperms
- Clade: Eudicots
- Order: Caryophyllales
- Family: Nepenthaceae
- Genus: Nepenthes
- Species: N. × mirabilata

Binomial name
- Nepenthes × mirabilata Hort. ex Lauffenburger (1995) nom.nud.

Species of carnivorous plant

Nepenthes × mirabilata (/nɪˈpɛnθiːz mɪˌræbɪˈlɑːtə/; a blend of mirabilis and alata) is a natural hybrid involving N. alata and N. mirabilis.

Nepenthes × mirabilata was mentioned as a natural hybrid in Guide to Nepenthes Hybrids (1995). The hybrid is restricted to Mindanao, the Philippines, the only location where the parent species overlap.
