= Ch'ien Lee =

Photographer and botanist

Ch'ien C. Lee (Chinese: 李乾; pinyin: Lǐ Qián) is a photographer and botanist specialising in the carnivorous plant genus Nepenthes. Lee has described several new Nepenthes species, including N. baramensis (now known as N. hemsleyana), N. chaniana, N. gantungensis, N. glandulifera, N. jamban, N. lingulata, N. palawanensis, N. pitopangii, N. platychila, and N. harauensis. Lee also described the natural hybrid N. × bauensis.

Ch'ien Lee holds a B.Sc. in Biology/Ecology from the University of California Santa Cruz. Having maintained a keen interest in nature since a child, his enthusiasm has led him to study various subjects ranging from entomology to animal tracking and ethnobotany, and eventually to work as a naturalist and environmental educator in the East Bay Regional Parks in northern California. In 1996, fulfilling a lifelong desire to live in the tropics, he moved to Sarawak (East Malaysia, on the island of Borneo) to work in a program for the propagation of native plant species.

Ch'ien studied photography while at school and has always considered it an excellent method to convey ideas and share his fascination about natural subjects encountered during his travels. His hobby became a professional endeavor in 2003. "Borneo is a fantastic place to live if you've got an insatiable interest in nature. It's easy for a photographer to get spoiled by the overwhelming diversity of subjects every time you're out. Of course working in the tropics presents some real obstacles for photography, but it's always worth the effort."

Tropical pitcher plants (Nepenthes) have been a major focus of his for over 12 years, and he has published a number of papers on their taxonomy: "A lot of my travel over the past decade has been in the pursuit of rare Nepenthes and this has taken me to many really remote parts of Southeast Asia." His photographs have appeared in numerous articles and books, and are featured in Pitcher Plants of Sarawak, The Fishes of Kuching Rivers, and the second edition of Pitcher Plants of Borneo. He occasionally undertakes assignment photography, although freelance work remains his main interest.

In addition to his photography, Ch'ien is currently engaged as a consultant at the Botanical Research Centre (Sarawak Forestry Corporation) in Kuching and also periodically works as a nature guide for private group tours in Sarawak and Sabah, and occasionally the Philippines and Indonesia.

== Publications ==
- Lee, C.C. 2002. "Nepenthes species of the Hose Mountains in Sarawak, Borneo" (PDF). Proceedings of the 4th International Carnivorous Plant Conference, Hiroshima University, Tokyo: 25–30.
- Lee, C.C. 2002. Nepenthes platychila (Nepenthaceae), a New Species of Pitcher Plant from Sarawak, Borneo. Gardens Bulletin Singapore 54: 257–261.
- Clarke, C.M. & C.C. Lee 2004. A Pocket Guide: Pitcher Plants of Sarawak. Natural History Publications (Borneo), Kota Kinabalu. vi + 81 pp.
- Lee, C.C. 2004. Nepenthes. In: Sarawak Bau Limestone Biodiversity. H.S. Yong, F.S.P. Ng and E.E.L. Yen (eds). The Sarawak Museum Journal Vol. LIX, No. 80; Special Issue No. 6: 71–77.
- Lee, C.C. 2004. New records and a new species of Nepenthes (Nepenthaceae) from Sarawak. Sandakania 15: 93–101.
- Clarke, C.M., C.C. Lee & S. McPherson 2006. Nepenthes chaniana (Nepenthaceae), a new species from north-western Borneo. Sabah Parks Journal 7: 53–66.
- Lee, C.C., Hernawati & P. Akhriadi 2006. Two new species of Nepenthes (Nepenthaceae) from North Sumatra. Blumea 51(3): 561–568.
- Phillips, A., A. Lamb & C.C. Lee 2008. Pitcher Plants of Borneo. Second Edition. Natural History Publications (Borneo), Kota Kinabalu.
- Lee, C.C., S. McPherson, G. Bourke & M. Mansur 2009. Nepenthes pitopangii (Nepenthaceae), a new species from central Sulawesi, Indonesia. Gardens' Bulletin Singapore 61(1): 95–100.
- Clarke, C., J.A. Moran & C.C. Lee 2011. Nepenthes baramensis (Nepenthaceae) – a new species from north-western Borneo . Blumea 56(3): 229–233. doi:10.3767/000651911X607121
