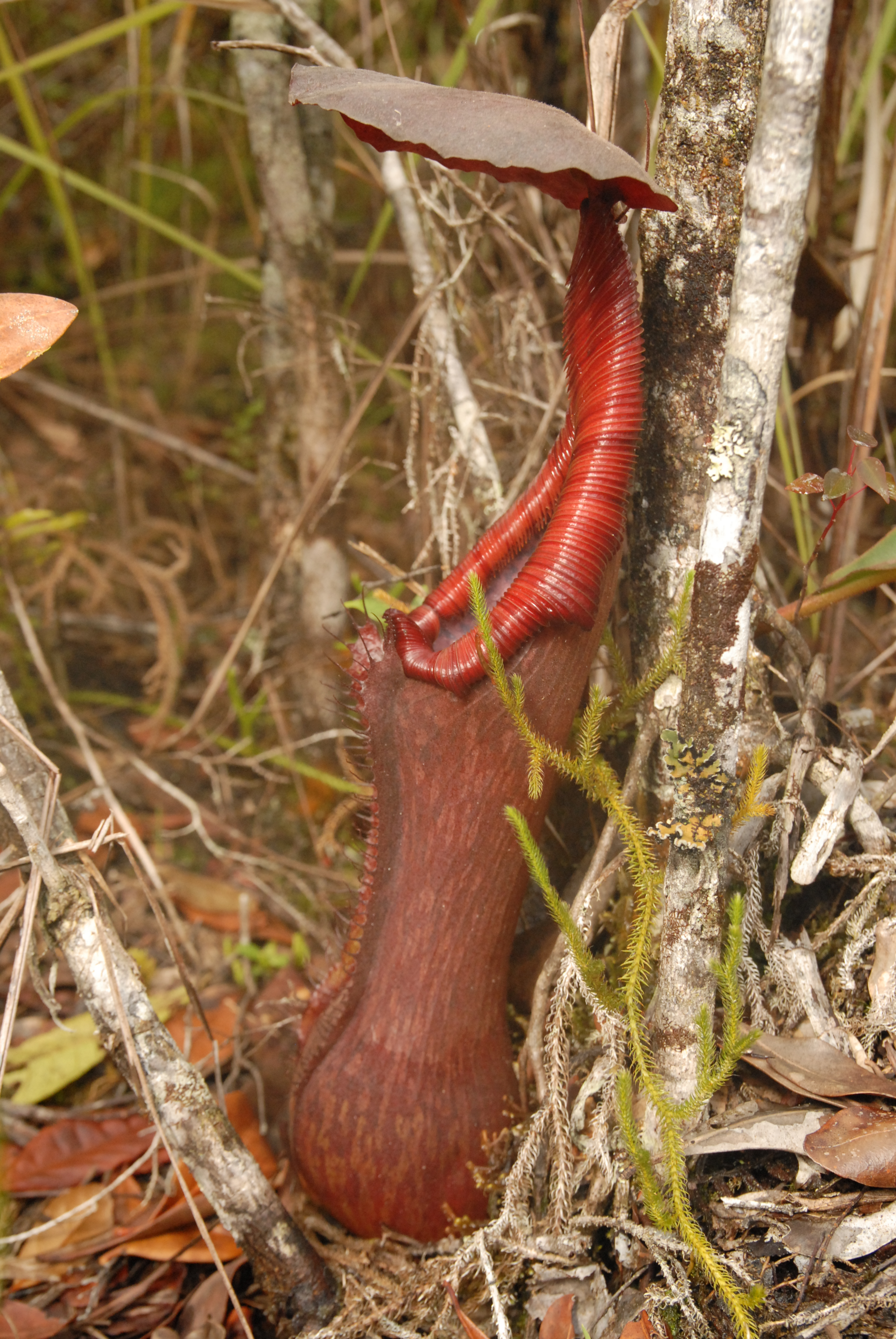

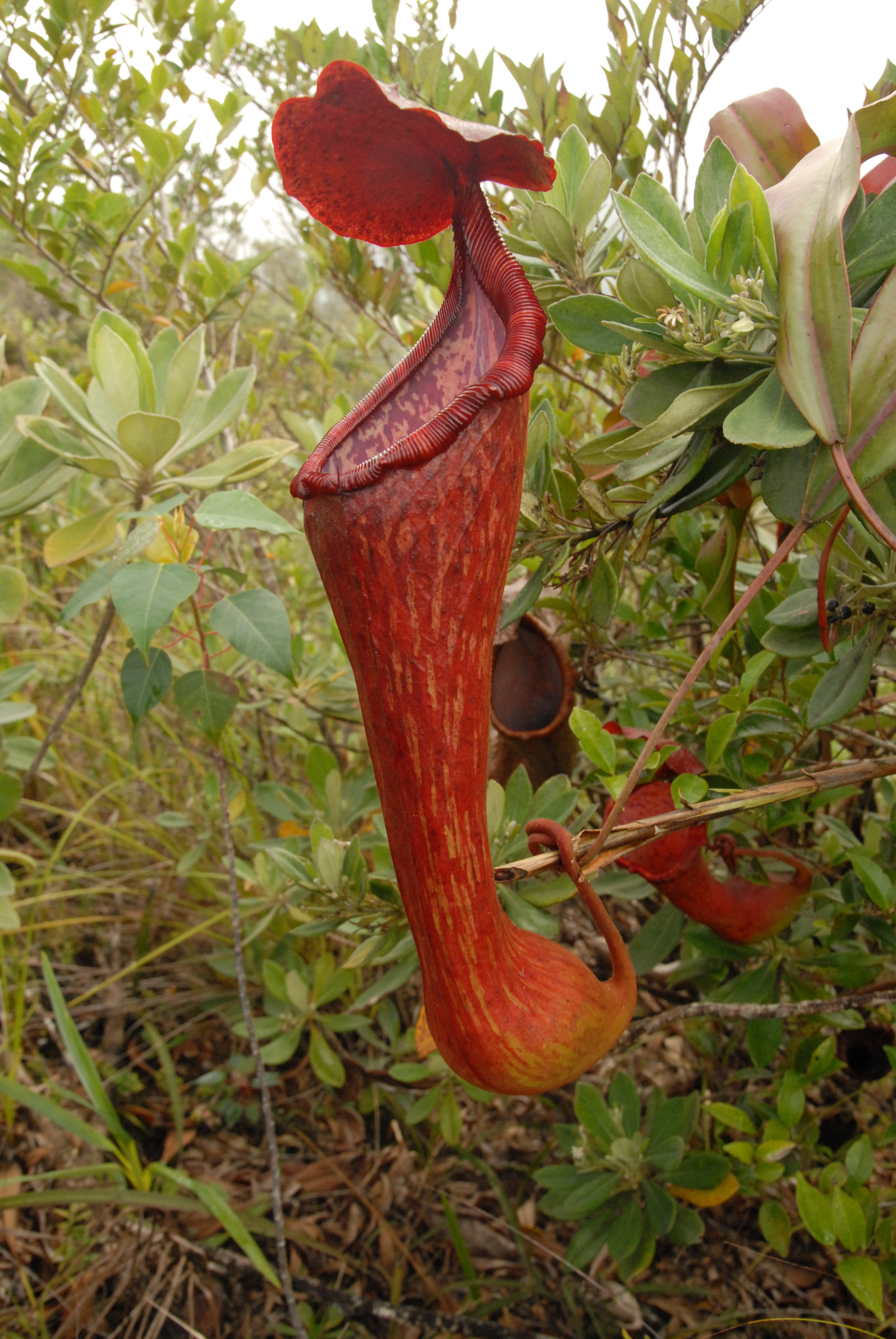
- A lower (top) and an upper pitcher (bottom) from the type locality on Mount Kiamo

Scientific classification
- Kingdom: Plantae
- Clade: Tracheophytes
- Clade: Angiosperms
- Clade: Eudicots
- Order: Caryophyllales
- Family: Nepenthaceae
- Genus: Nepenthes
- Species: N. pulchra

Binomial name
- Nepenthes pulchra Gronem., S.McPherson, Coritico, Micheler, Marwinski & V.B.Amoroso (2011)

= Nepenthes pulchra =

Species of pitcher plant from the Philippines

Nepenthes pulchra is a tropical pitcher plant endemic to the Philippine island of Mindanao, where it grows at 1,300–1,800 m above sea level. Its discovery was announced online in August 2011.

== Natural hybrids ==
- N. alata × N. pulchra
- N. ceciliae × N. pulchra
