= Bonamia rosea =

Felty bellflower

Scientific classification
- Kingdom: Plantae
- Clade: Tracheophytes
- Clade: Angiosperms
- Clade: Eudicots
- Clade: Asterids
- Order: Solanales
- Family: Convolvulaceae
- Genus: Bonamia
- Species: B. rosea

Binomial name
- Bonamia rosea (F.Muell.) Hallier f.

Species of flowering plant

Bonamia rosea, commonly known as felty bellflower, is a herb in the family Convolvulaceae.

The perennial herb or shrub has an erect or diffuse habit and typically grows to a height of 0.1 to 0.7 metres (0.33 to 2.30 ft). It blooms between May and October and produces white-pink-yellow flowers.

It is found on sand plains in the Mid West and Pilbara regions of Western Australia where it grows in stony sandy-clay soils.
