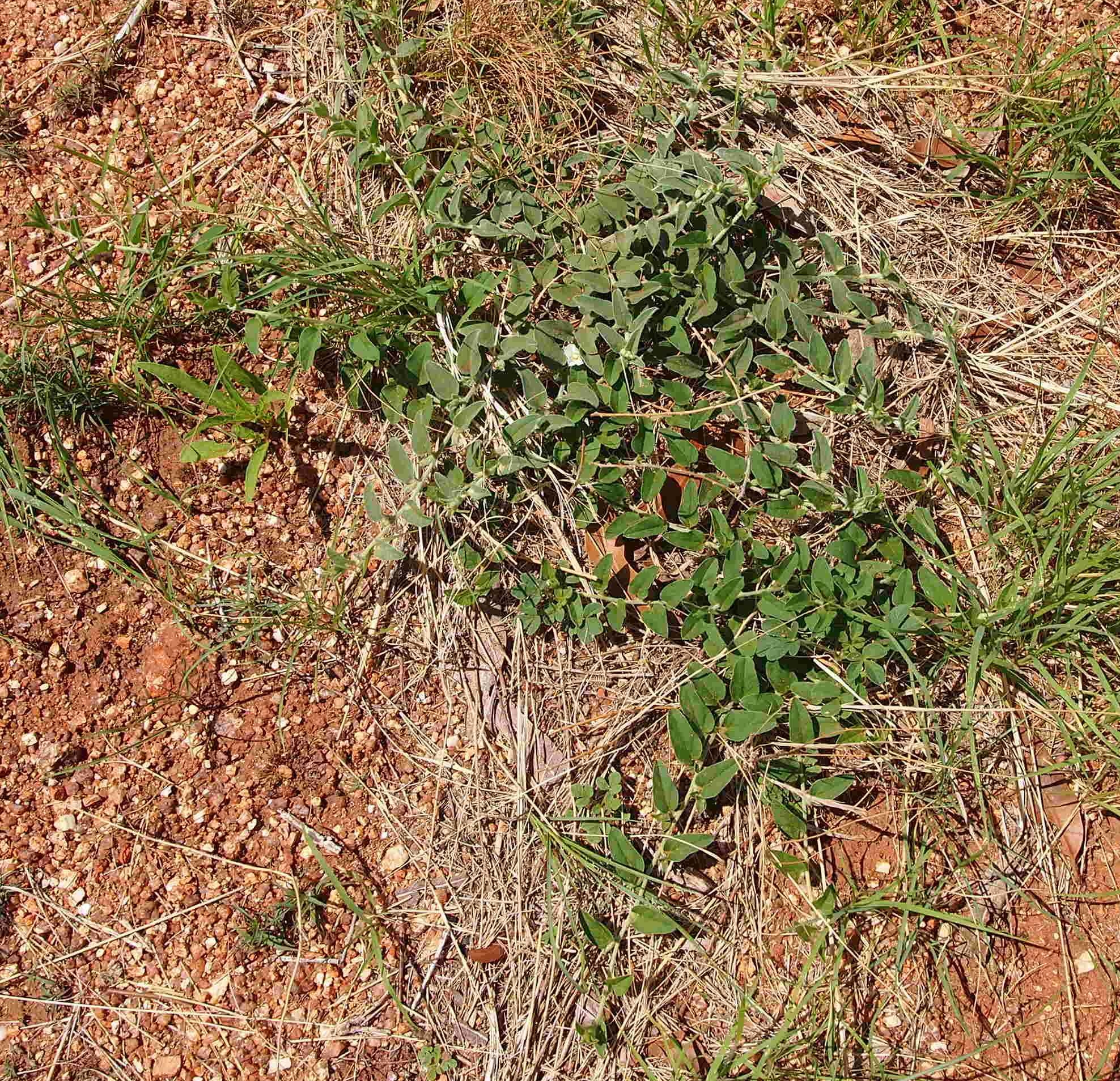

Scientific classification
- Kingdom: Plantae
- Clade: Tracheophytes
- Clade: Angiosperms
- Clade: Eudicots
- Clade: Asterids
- Order: Solanales
- Family: Convolvulaceae
- Genus: Bonamia
- Species: B. media

Binomial name
- Bonamia media (R.Br.) Hallier f.

= Bonamia media =

Species of flowering plant

Bonamia media is a herb in the family Convolvulaceae.

The perennial herb has a prostrate habit. It produces white-blue flowers.

It is found throughout northern Australia in a wide variety of land types. In Western Australia it is much more restricted being found on floodplains and basalt hillslopes in the Kimberley and Pilbara regions where it grows in sandy rocky alluvium.
