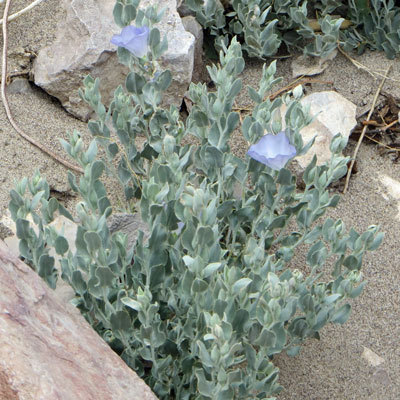
- In Big Bend National Park, Texas, US

Conservation status
- Critically Imperiled (NatureServe)

Scientific classification
- Kingdom: Plantae
- Clade: Tracheophytes
- Clade: Angiosperms
- Clade: Eudicots
- Clade: Asterids
- Order: Solanales
- Family: Convolvulaceae
- Genus: Bonamia
- Species: B. ovalifolia

Binomial name
- Bonamia ovalifolia (Torr.) Hallier f.

= Bonamia ovalifolia =

Species of flowering plant

Bonamia ovalifolia is a species of flowering plant in the morning glory family known by the common name bigpod lady's nightcap. It is native to North America, where there are only two known occurrences. There is one each in Brewster County, Texas, and Coahuila on the opposite side of the Mexico–United States border.

This plant produces a number of unbranching stems from a woody base. The silvery, blue-green leaves are round and about 1 centimeter in diameter. The purple flowers are each about 2 centimeters wide and bloom in May and June. The fruit is a rounded capsule.

The plant's habitat is the sandy stretches of land next to the Rio Grande at the border between the two countries.
