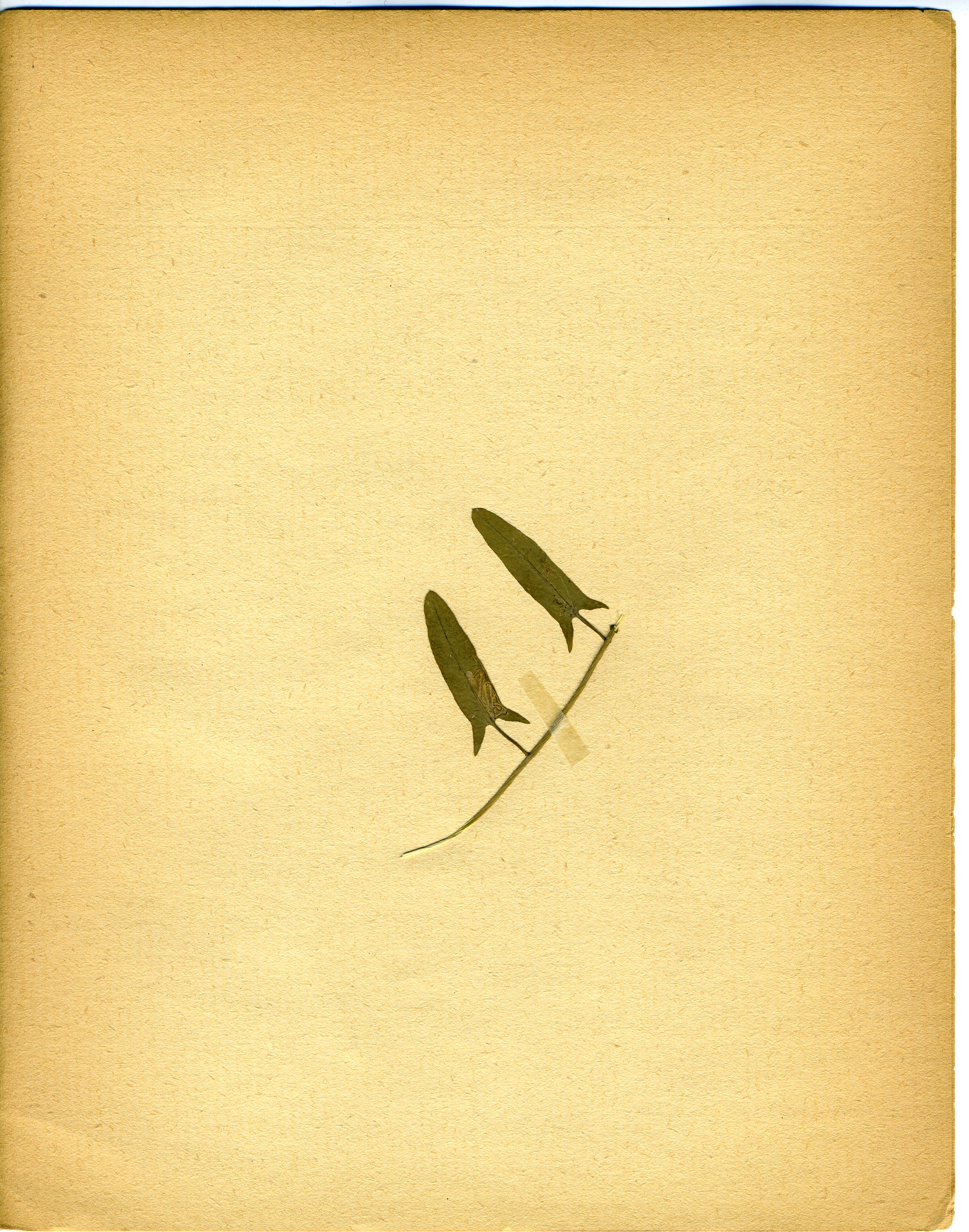

Scientific classification
- Kingdom: Animalia
- Phylum: Arthropoda
- Clade: Pancrustacea
- Class: Insecta
- Order: Lepidoptera
- Family: Nepticulidae
- Genus: Stigmella
- Species: S. freyella

Binomial name
- Stigmella freyella (Heyden, 1858)

Synonyms
- Nepticula freyella Heyden, 1858

= Stigmella freyella =

Species of moth

Stigmella freyella is a moth of the family Nepticulidae. It is found from the Netherlands to the Baltic region and Russia, southwards to the Mediterranean region. It is also found in North Africa.

The wingspan is 4–5 millimetres (0.16–0.20 in). In Central Europe there are two generations per year.

The larvae feed on Calystegia sepium, Calystegia soldanella, Convolvulus althaeoides, Convolvulus arvensis and Convolvulus elegans. They mine the leaves of their host plant.
