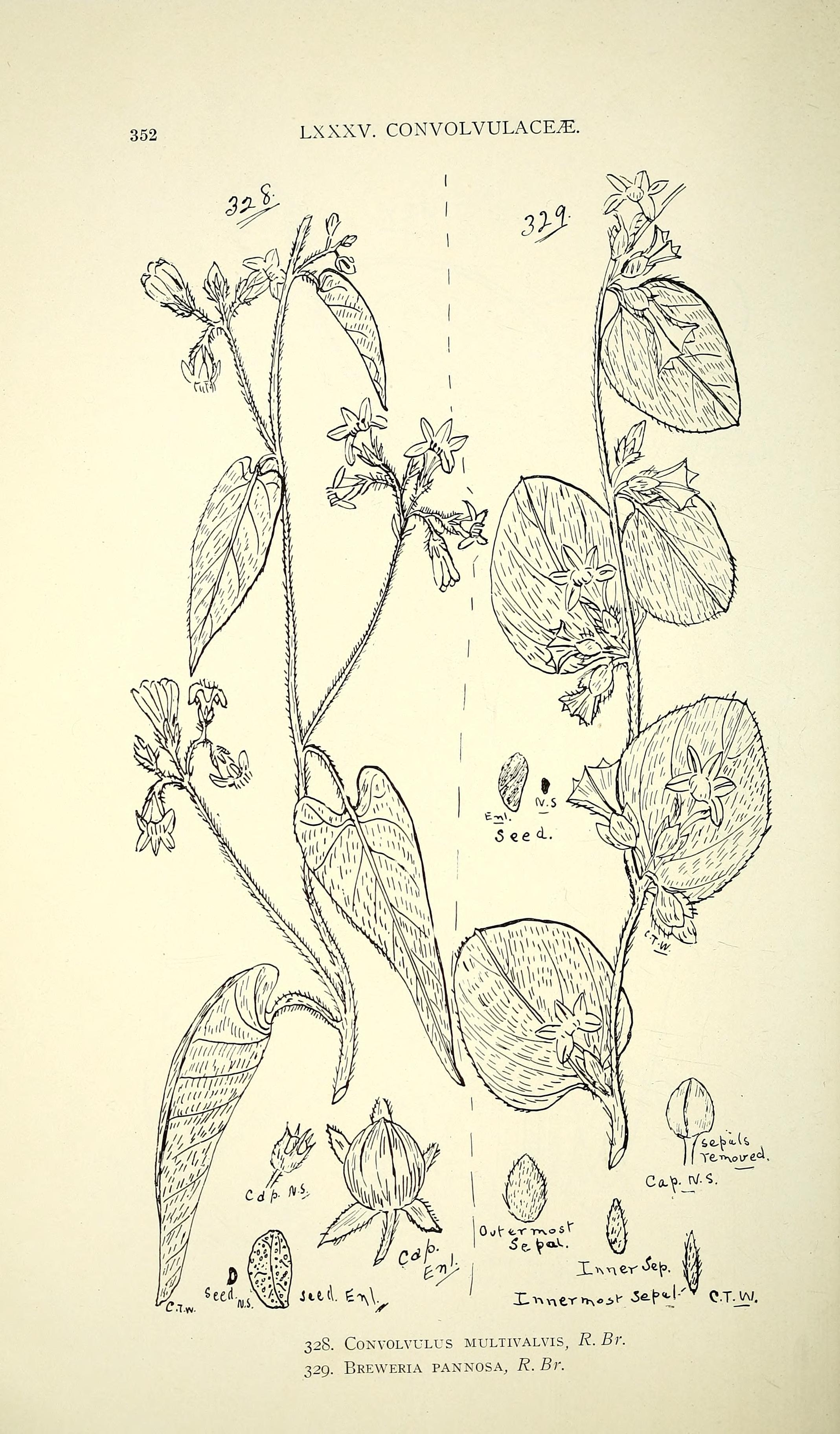

Scientific classification
- Kingdom: Plantae
- Clade: Tracheophytes
- Clade: Angiosperms
- Clade: Eudicots
- Clade: Asterids
- Order: Solanales
- Family: Convolvulaceae
- Genus: Bonamia
- Species: B. linearis

Binomial name
- Bonamia linearis (R.Br.) Hallier f.

= Bonamia linearis =

Species of flowering plant

Bonamia linearis is a herb in the family Convolvulaceae.

The perennial herb has a prostrate trailing habit. It blooms between October and July and produces white-cream flowers.

It is found on sand plains in the Kimberley and Pilbara regions of Western Australia where it grows in sandy soils.
