= Seddera pedunculata =

Conservation status
- Data Deficient (IUCN 3.1)

Scientific classification
- Kingdom: Plantae
- Clade: Tracheophytes
- Clade: Angiosperms
- Clade: Eudicots
- Clade: Asterids
- Order: Solanales
- Family: Convolvulaceae
- Genus: Seddera
- Species: S. pedunculata

Binomial name
- Seddera pedunculata (Balf.f.) Hallier f.

Synonyms
- Breweria pedunculata Balf.f.

Species of plant

Seddera pedunculata is a species of plant in the family Convolvulaceae. It is a subshrub endemic to Socotra in Yemen.
