= Bonamia pannosa =

Scientific classification
- Kingdom: Plantae
- Clade: Tracheophytes
- Clade: Angiosperms
- Clade: Eudicots
- Clade: Asterids
- Order: Solanales
- Family: Convolvulaceae
- Genus: Bonamia
- Species: B. pannosa

Binomial name
- Bonamia pannosa (R.Br.) Hallier f.

Species of flowering plant

Bonamia pannosa is a herb in the family Convolvulaceae.

The perennial or annual herb has a spreading prostrate habit and typically grows to a height of 0.05 to 0.4 metres (0.16 to 1.31 ft). It blooms between January and October and produces purple-blue flowers.

It is found on floodplains and along watercourses in the Kimberley and Pilbara regions of Western Australia where it grows in sandy soils.
