= Bonamia elegans =

Scientific classification
- Kingdom: Plantae
- Clade: Tracheophytes
- Clade: Angiosperms
- Clade: Eudicots
- Clade: Asterids
- Order: Solanales
- Family: Convolvulaceae
- Genus: Bonamia
- Species: B. elegans

Binomial name
- Bonamia elegans (Choisy) Hallier f.

Synonyms
- Breweria elegans Choisy; Breweria grandiflora A. Gray; Breweriopsis elegans (Choisy) Roberty; Convolvulus elegans Wall.

Species of flowering plant

Bonamia elegans is a flowering plant species in the genus Bonamia. It grows in Myanmar.
