= Bonamia pilbarensis =

Scientific classification
- Kingdom: Plantae
- Clade: Tracheophytes
- Clade: Angiosperms
- Clade: Eudicots
- Clade: Asterids
- Order: Solanales
- Family: Convolvulaceae
- Genus: Bonamia
- Species: B. pilbarensis

Binomial name
- Bonamia pilbarensis R.W.Johnson

Species of flowering plant

Bonamia pilbarensis is a herb in the family Convolvulaceae.

The herb is found in the Pilbara region of Western Australia.
