= Bonamia alatisemina =

Scientific classification
- Kingdom: Plantae
- Clade: Tracheophytes
- Clade: Angiosperms
- Clade: Eudicots
- Clade: Asterids
- Order: Solanales
- Family: Convolvulaceae
- Genus: Bonamia
- Species: B. alatisemina

Binomial name
- Bonamia alatisemina R.W.Johnson

Species of flowering plant

Bonamia alatisemina is a herb in the family Convolvulaceae.

The creeping perennial herb typically grows to a height of 0.2 metres (0.7 ft). It blooms between April and May producing pink-white flowers.

It is found on sandplains in the Kimberley and Pilbara regions of Western Australia where it grows in sandy soils.
