= Bonamia brevifolia =

Conservation status
- Priority One — Poorly Known Taxa (DEC)

Scientific classification
- Kingdom: Plantae
- Clade: Tracheophytes
- Clade: Angiosperms
- Clade: Eudicots
- Clade: Asterids
- Order: Solanales
- Family: Convolvulaceae
- Genus: Bonamia
- Species: B. brevifolia

Binomial name
- Bonamia brevifolia (Benth.) Myint

Synonyms
- Bonamia linearis var. brevifolia (Benth.) Hallier f.; Breweria brevifolia Benth.

Species of flowering plant

Bonamia brevifolia is a herb in the family Convolvulaceae.

The prostrate herb typically grows to a height of 0.4 metres (1.3 ft) and produces purple-white flowers.
