= François Bonamy =

French botanist and physician (1710–1786)

François Bonamy (10 May 1710 in Nantes – 5 January 1786 in Nantes) was a French botanist and physician. He was the grandfather of adventurer Paul de la Gironière (1797–1862).

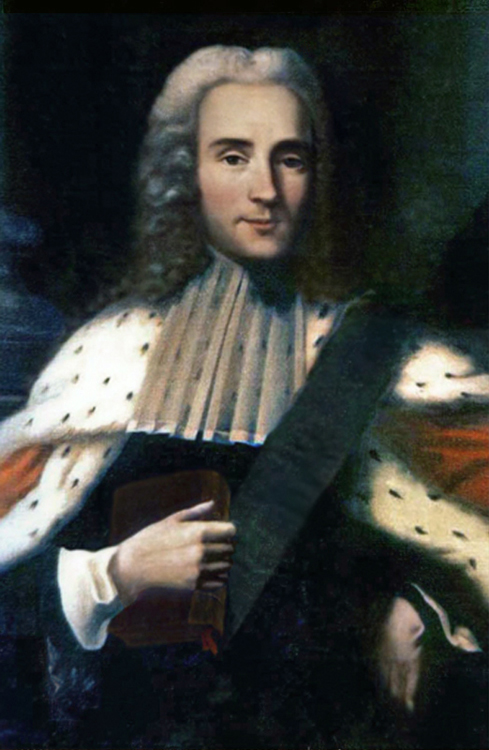
François Bonamy (1710–1786)

In 1735 he obtained his medical doctorate, and for nearly fifty years, he taught classes in botany. At the University of Nantes, he served as regent to the medical faculty, as procureur général and as an academic rector. In 1737 he was named directeur de l'établissement of the Jardin des plantes de Nantes. At his own expense, he maintained a botanical garden containing exotic plants.

He was a founding member of the Société d'agriculture de Bretagne and a corresponding member of the Académie des belles-lettres, sciences et arts de La Rochelle.

The botanical genus Bonamia (family Convolvulaceae) was named in his honour by Louis-Marie Aubert du Petit-Thouars.

== Published works ==
- Tentamen therapeuticum de bechicis, J. Martel, Snr., 1776.
- Florae Nannetensis prodromus, Brun, 1782.
- Une épidémie au siècle dernier d'après les notes de François Bonamy, Commentaires par le Dr. Eugène Bonamy. - Nantes : Mme Ve Mellinet, 1886.
