= Mount Kelam =

Mountain in Borneo

Coordinates: 0°04′47″N 111°40′20″E

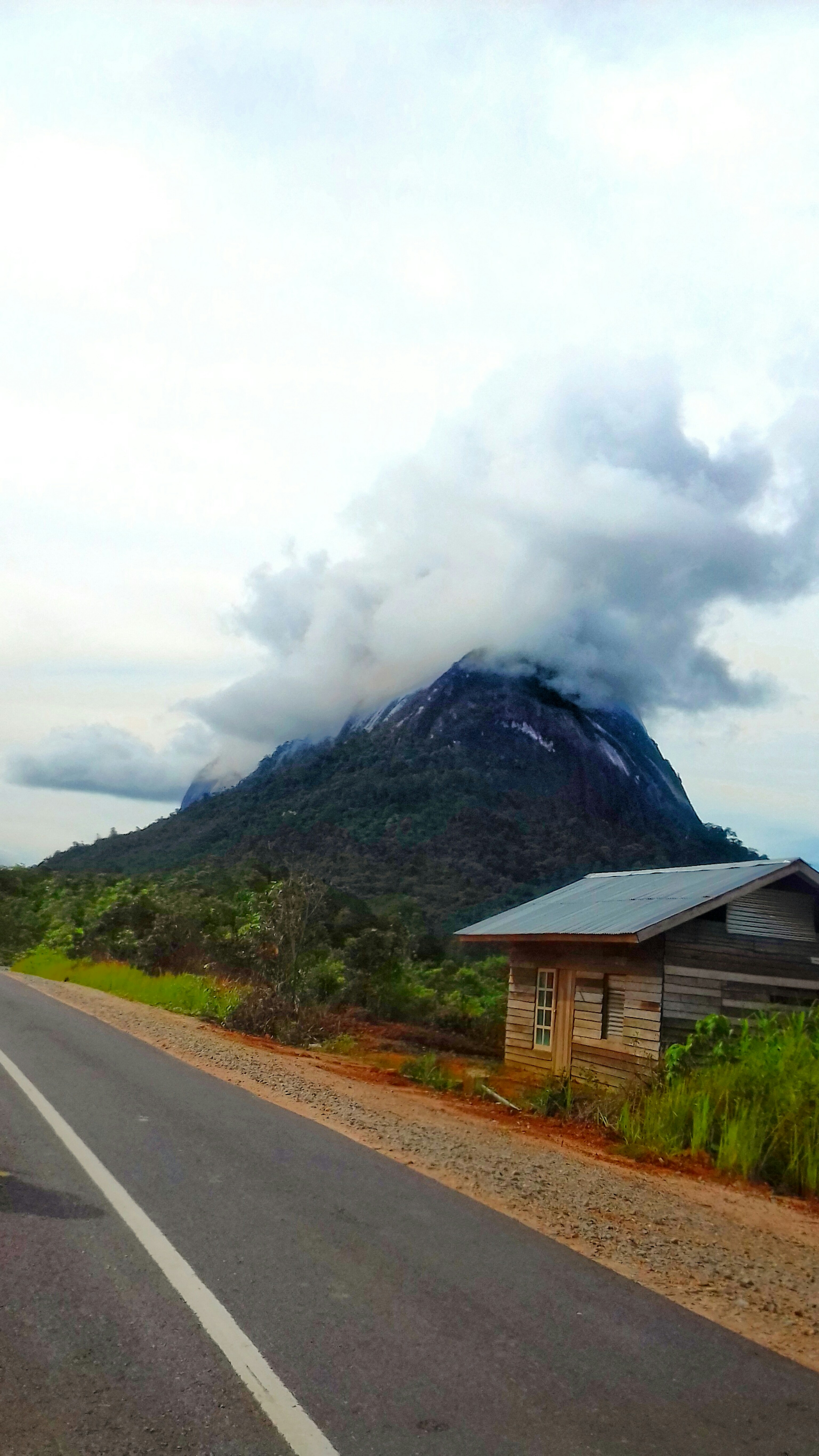
- View of Mount Kelam

Highest point
- Elevation: 1,002 m (3,287 ft)

Geography
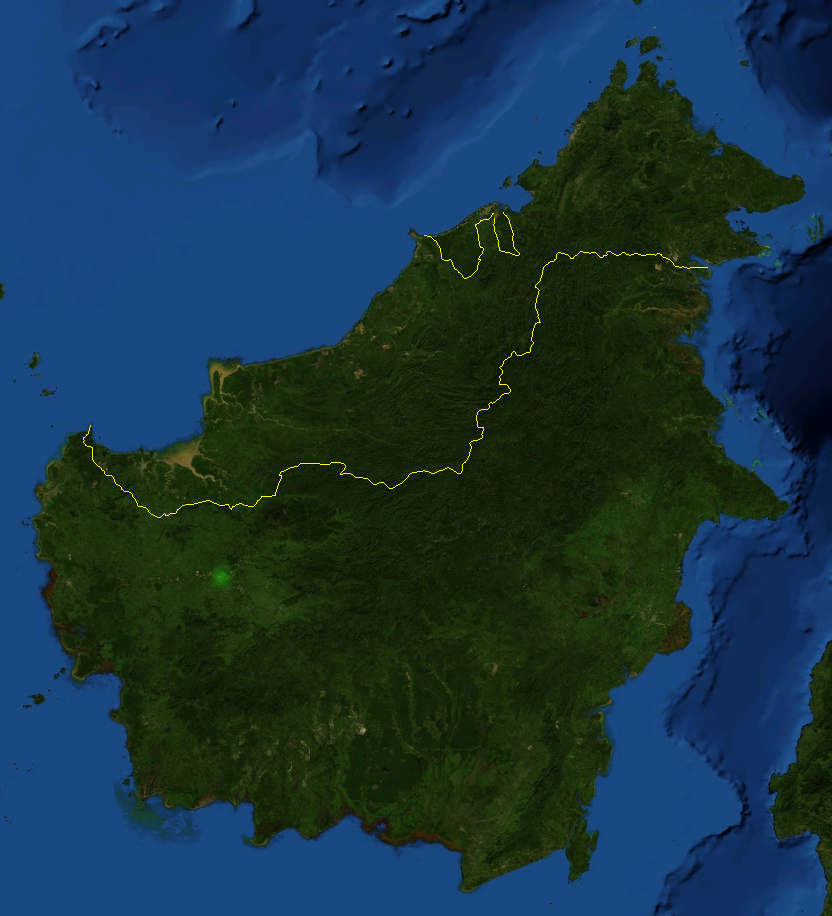
- Location of Mount Kelam
- Location: West Kalimantan, Borneo

Mount Kelam (Indonesian: Gunung Kelam) is an exposed granitic dome in West Kalimantan, Borneo, with an elevation of 1,002 m.

In 1894, German botanist Johannes Gottfried Hallier became the second European to climb Mount Kelam, after a certain Dr. Gürtler. Hallier ascended the summit 5 times between January 30 and February 13. He wrote the following account of the mountain:

Mount K'lamm is a unique mountain of grand beauty. It rises singly and abruptly from a wide plain overgrown by young forest almost up to 1000 m above sea level and stretches approximately from west to east. Up to about half the mountain the steep slopes are covered with vigorous virgin forest, but the upper half is encompassed by mighty, almost vertical cliffs made of rock, over which water runs down in numerous gullies. Above the upper edge of the cliff there is high mountain vegetation compiled of bushes and small trees.
[translated from the original German in Pitcher Plants of the Old World]

The mountain's summit area was relatively inaccessible in Hallier's time and remains so today. Hallier described it as follows:

After once again climbing a steep slope with Gleichenia thickets, one stands suddenly beneath the high enclosing rock wall of the mountain ring. The smooth water-washed stone seamed with water channels shows no variation in structure, and it appears almost as if the whole mountain was composed of a single monstrous block of rock. On this wall has been erected the steep 45 metre high rattan ladder; it is secured only at the bottom, in the middle and in the solid earth at the top, the rest lying free against the stone.
[translated from the original Dutch and German in Pitcher Plants of Borneo]

Leptospermum trees form a sparse canopy on the mountain's upper slopes, while grasses and Sphagnum moss cover the ground. The critically endangered pitcher plant species Nepenthes clipeata is endemic to Mount Kelam. Other Nepenthes native to this mountain include N. albomarginata, N. ampullaria, N. rafflesiana, and N. reinwardtiana. However, habitat stresses such as droughts and forest fires (particularly those caused by the El Niño of 1997–1998) have destroyed much of the summit vegetation. The highly sought-after N. clipeata has additionally suffered from overcollection by plant hunters and is now close to extinction in the wild.
