= Bonamia wilsoniae =

Conservation status
- Priority Three — Poorly Known Taxa (DEC)

Scientific classification
- Kingdom: Plantae
- Clade: Tracheophytes
- Clade: Angiosperms
- Clade: Eudicots
- Clade: Asterids
- Order: Solanales
- Family: Convolvulaceae
- Genus: Bonamia
- Species: B. wilsoniae

Binomial name
- Bonamia wilsoniae R.W.Johnson

Species of flowering plant

Bonamia wilsoniae is a herb in the family Convolvulaceae that is native to Western Australia.
