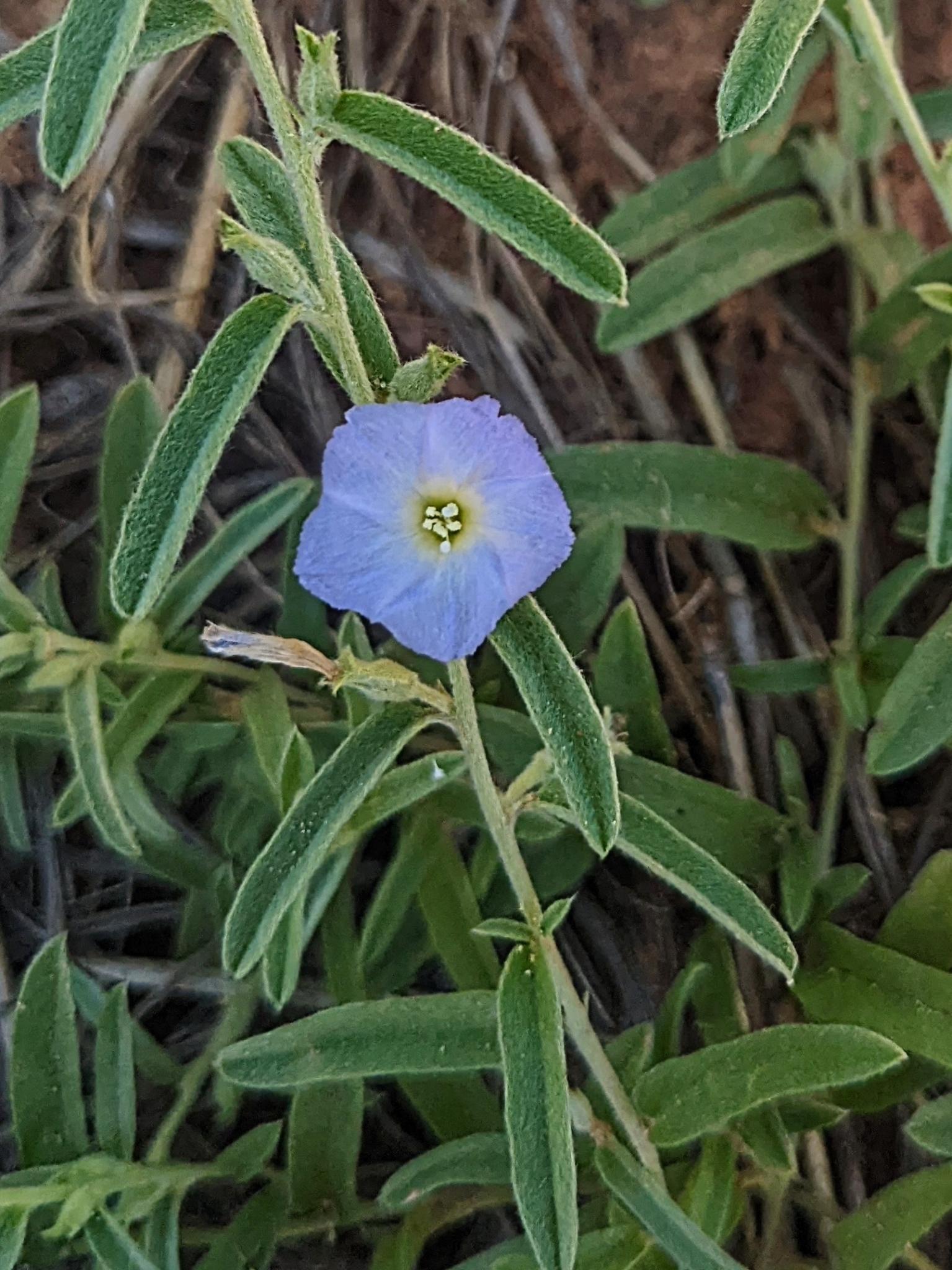

Conservation status
- Priority One — Poorly Known Taxa (DEC)

Scientific classification
- Kingdom: Plantae
- Clade: Tracheophytes
- Clade: Angiosperms
- Clade: Eudicots
- Clade: Asterids
- Order: Solanales
- Family: Convolvulaceae
- Genus: Bonamia
- Species: B. oblongifolia

Binomial name
- Bonamia oblongifolia Myint

= Bonamia oblongifolia =

Species of flowering plant

Bonamia oblongifolia is a species of plant in the family Convolvulaceae.

The perennial herb or shrub blooms in February and produces blue flowers.

It is found in a few scattered locations in the Kimberley regions of Western Australia where it grows in sandy-rocky soils.
