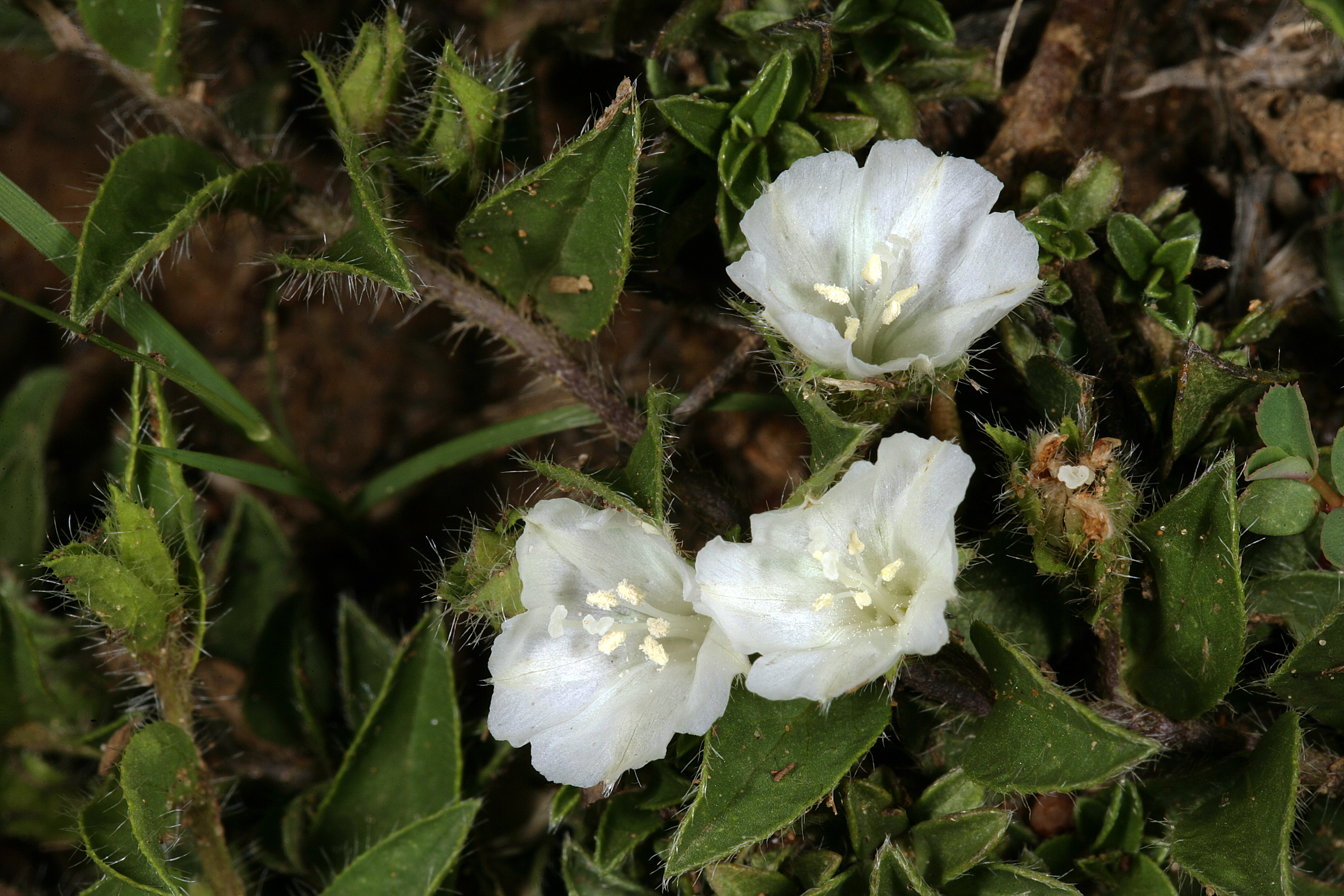
- Seddera capensis

Scientific classification
- Kingdom: Plantae
- Clade: Tracheophytes
- Clade: Angiosperms
- Clade: Eudicots
- Clade: Asterids
- Order: Solanales
- Family: Convolvulaceae
- Tribe: Cresseae
- Genus: Seddera; Hochst. (1844)

Synonyms
- Schizanthoseddera (Roberty) Roberty (1964); Sedderopsis (Roberty) Roberty (1952)

= Seddera =

Genus of bindweeds

Seddera is a genus of flowering plants in the bindweed family Convolvulaceae.

There are currently 28 known species. Although it is mainly native to Africa, the plant extends to Arabia and India.

== Species ==
The following species are recognised in the genus Seddera:

- Seddera arabica (Forssk.) Choisy
- Seddera bagshawei Rendle
- Seddera bracteata Verdc.
- Seddera capensis (E.Mey. ex Choisy) Hallier f.
- Seddera cinerea Hutch. & E.A.Bruce
- Seddera erlangeriana Engl. & Pilg.
- Seddera evolvuloides (Choisy) Wight
- Seddera glomerata (Balf.f.) O.Schwartz
- Seddera hadramautica R.R.Mill
- Seddera hallieri Engl. & Pilg.
- Seddera hirsuta Dammer ex Hallier f.
- Seddera humilis Hallier f.
- Seddera intermedia Hochst. & Steud.
- Seddera latifolia Hochst. & Steud.
- Seddera madagascariensis Deroin & Sebsebe
- Seddera micrantha Pilg.
- Seddera namibica Sebsebe
- Seddera ogadenensis Sebsebe
- Seddera pedunculata (Balf.f.) Verdc.
- Seddera repens Hallier f.
- Seddera retusa R.R.Mill
- Seddera rhodantha R.R.Mill
- Seddera schizantha Hallier f.
- Seddera secundiflora Jaub. & Spach
- Seddera simmonsii Verdc.
- Seddera suffruticosa (Schinz) Hallier f.
- Seddera velutina R.R.Mill
- Seddera virgata Hochst. & Steud.

=== Formerly placed here ===
- Convolvulus semhaensis (R.R.Mill) J.A.Luna & Carine (as Seddera semhaensis R.R.Mill)
