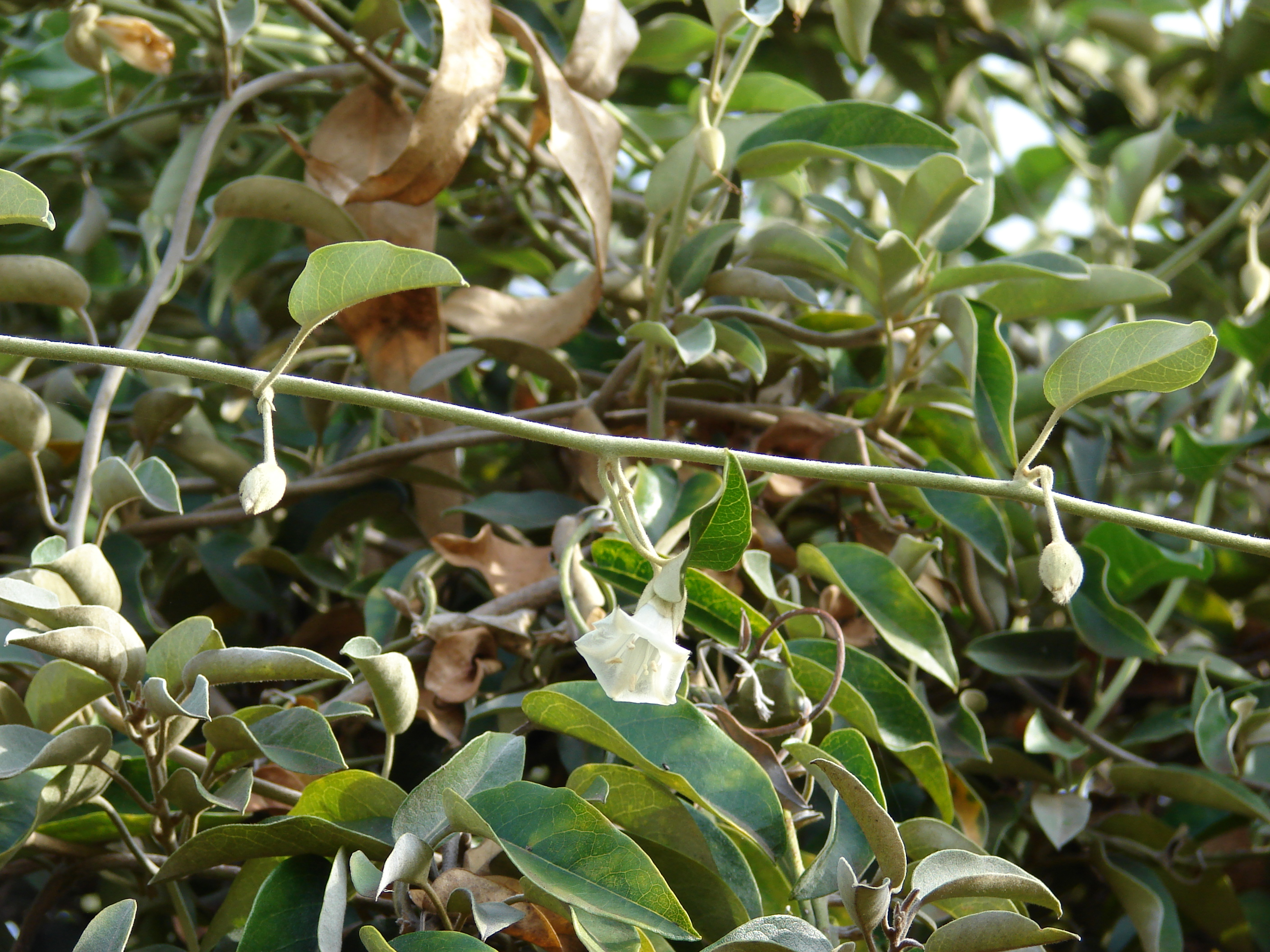
- Bonamia menziesii

Scientific classification
- Kingdom: Plantae
- Clade: Tracheophytes
- Clade: Angiosperms
- Clade: Eudicots
- Clade: Asterids
- Order: Solanales
- Family: Convolvulaceae
- Tribe: Cresseae
- Genus: Bonamia; Thouars

Species
- See text

Synonyms
- Breueria R.Br.; Breueriopsis Roberty; Breweria R.Br.; Perispermum O.Deg.; Breweriopsis Roberty; Petrogenia I.M.Johnst.; Trichantha Triana

= Bonamia =

Genus of flowering plants

Bonamia is a genus of the flowering plant family Convolvulaceae, commonly known as the bindweed family and named after the French physician and botanist François Bonamy (1710-1786). Members of the genus are commonly known as the lady's nightcap.

== Species ==
The following species are recognized in the genus Bonamia:

- B. abscissa (Choisy) Hallier f.
- B. agrostopolis (Vell.) Hallier f.
- B. alatisemina R.W.Johnson
- B. ankaranensis Deroin
- B. apikiensis Deroin
- B. apurensis D.F.Austin
- B. austinii A.Moreira & Sim.-Bianch.
- B. boivinii Hallier f.
- B. boliviana O'Donell
- B. brevifolia (Benth.) Myint
- B. campestris A.Moreira & Sim.-Bianch.
- B. capitata (Dammer) Ooststr.
- B. cerradoensis J.R.I.Wood
- B. chontalensis E.Carranza
- B. densiflora Hallier f.
- B. deserticola R.W.Johnson
- B. dietrichiana Hallier f.
- B. douglasii D.F.Austin
- B. elegans (Choisy) Hallier f.
- B. elliptica (L.B.Sm. & B.G.Schub.) Myint & D.B.Ward
- B. erecta R.W.Johnson
- B. ferruginea (Choisy) Hallier f.
- B. fruticosa R.W.Johnson
- B. gabonensis Breteler
- B. grandiflora (A.Gray) Hallier f. – Florida lady's nightcap
- B. holtii O'Donell
- B. jiviorum J.R.Grande
- B. krapovickasii A.Moreira & Sim.-Bianch.
- B. kuhlmannii Hoehne
- B. langsdorffii (Meisn.) Hallier f.
- B. leonii A.H.Gentry & Austin
- B. linearis (R.Br.) Hallier f.
- B. longipilosa R.W.Johnson
- B. longitubulosa Breteler
- B. maripoides Hallier f.
- B. media (R.Br.) Hallier f.
- B. menziesii A.Gray – Hawaiʻi lady's nightcap
- B. mexicana J.A.McDonald
- B. mossambicensis (Klotzsch) Hallier f.
- B. multicaulis (Brandegee) House
- B. multiflora R.W.Johnson
- B. ngouniensis Breteler
- B. nzabii Breteler
- B. oblongifolia Myint
- B. ovalifolia (Torr.) Hallier f. – Bigpod lady's nightcap
- B. pannosa (R.Br.) Hallier f.
- B. peruviana Ooststr.
- B. pilbarensis R.W.Johnson
- B. riograndina J.R.I.Wood
- B. rosea (F.Muell.) Hallier f.
- B. rosiewiseae J.R.I.Wood
- B. sedderoides Rendle
- B. semidigyna (Roxb.) Hallier f.
- B. sericea (Griseb.) Hallier f.
- B. spectabilis (Choisy) Hallier f.
- B. sphaerocephala (Dammer) Ooststr.
- B. subsessilis Hassl.
- B. sulphurea (Brandegee) Myint & D.B.Ward
- B. thunbergiana (Roem. & Schult.) F.N.Williams
- B. toniae R.W.Johnson
- B. trichantha Hallier f.
- B. tsivory Deroin
- B. umbellata (Choisy) Hallier f.
- B. velutina Verdc.
- B. vignei Hoyle
- B. wilsoniae R.W.Johnson
