= Bonamia erecta =

Scientific classification
- Kingdom: Plantae
- Clade: Tracheophytes
- Clade: Angiosperms
- Clade: Eudicots
- Clade: Asterids
- Order: Solanales
- Family: Convolvulaceae
- Genus: Bonamia
- Species: B. erecta

Binomial name
- Bonamia erecta R.W.Johnson

Species of flowering plant

Bonamia erecta is a shrub in the family Convolvulaceae.

The shrub typically grows to a height of 0.4 metres (1.3 ft) and produces white-cream flowers.

It is found on sandplains in the Mid West, Goldfields-Esperance, Gascoyne and Pilbara regions of Western Australia where it grows in red sandy soils.
