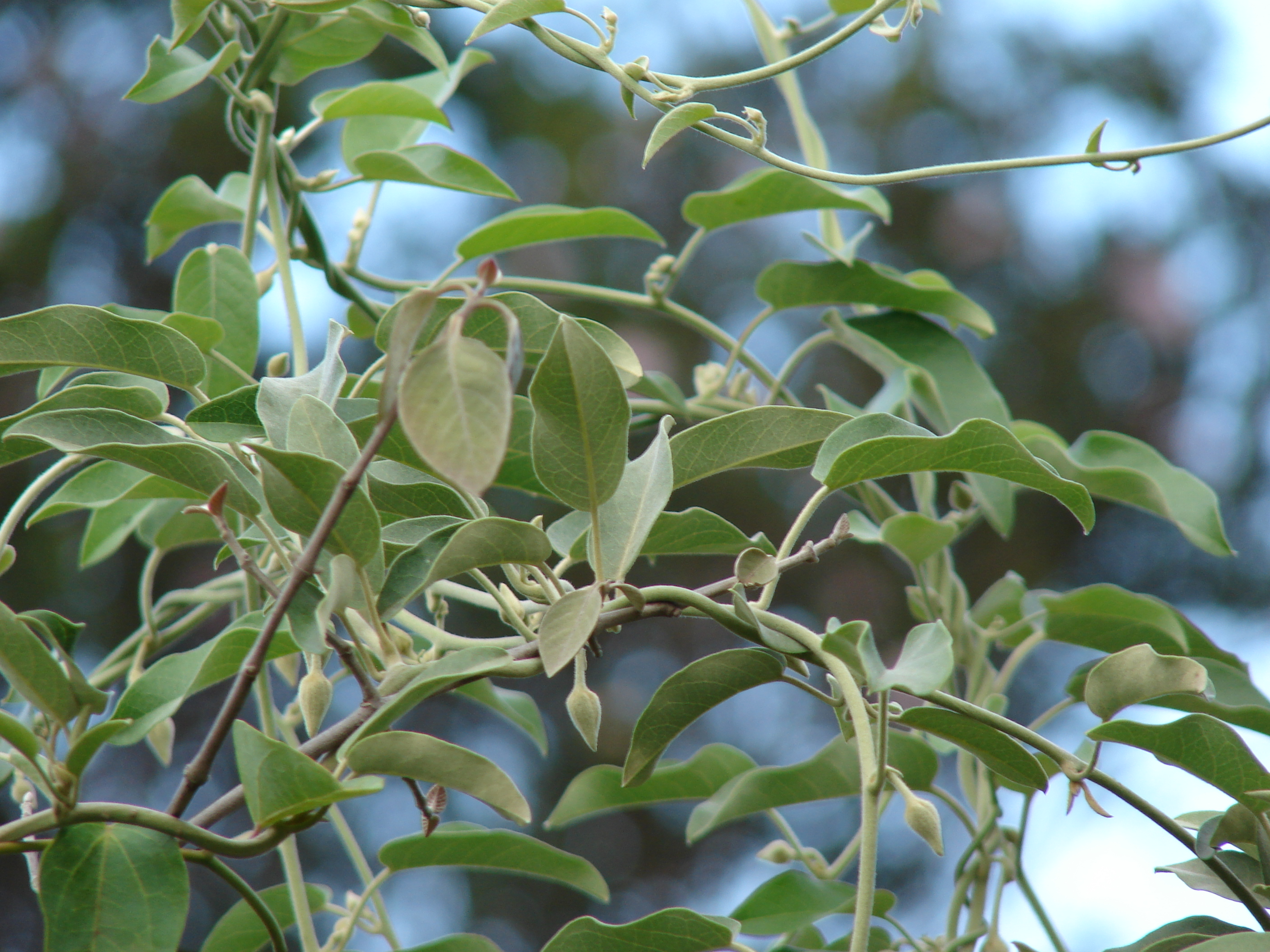

Conservation status
- Critically Endangered (IUCN 3.1)

Scientific classification
- Kingdom: Plantae
- Clade: Tracheophytes
- Clade: Angiosperms
- Clade: Eudicots
- Clade: Asterids
- Order: Solanales
- Family: Convolvulaceae
- Genus: Bonamia
- Species: B. menziesii

Binomial name
- Bonamia menziesii A.Gray

= Bonamia menziesii =

Hawaiʻi lady's nightcap

Species of flowering plant

Bonamia menziesii, commonly known as Hawaiʻi lady's nightcap, is a species of flowering plant in the morning glory family, Convolvulaceae, that is endemic to Hawaii. It is a vine or twisting liana with branches that inhabits steep slopes and level ground in Hawaiʻi.

== Description ==
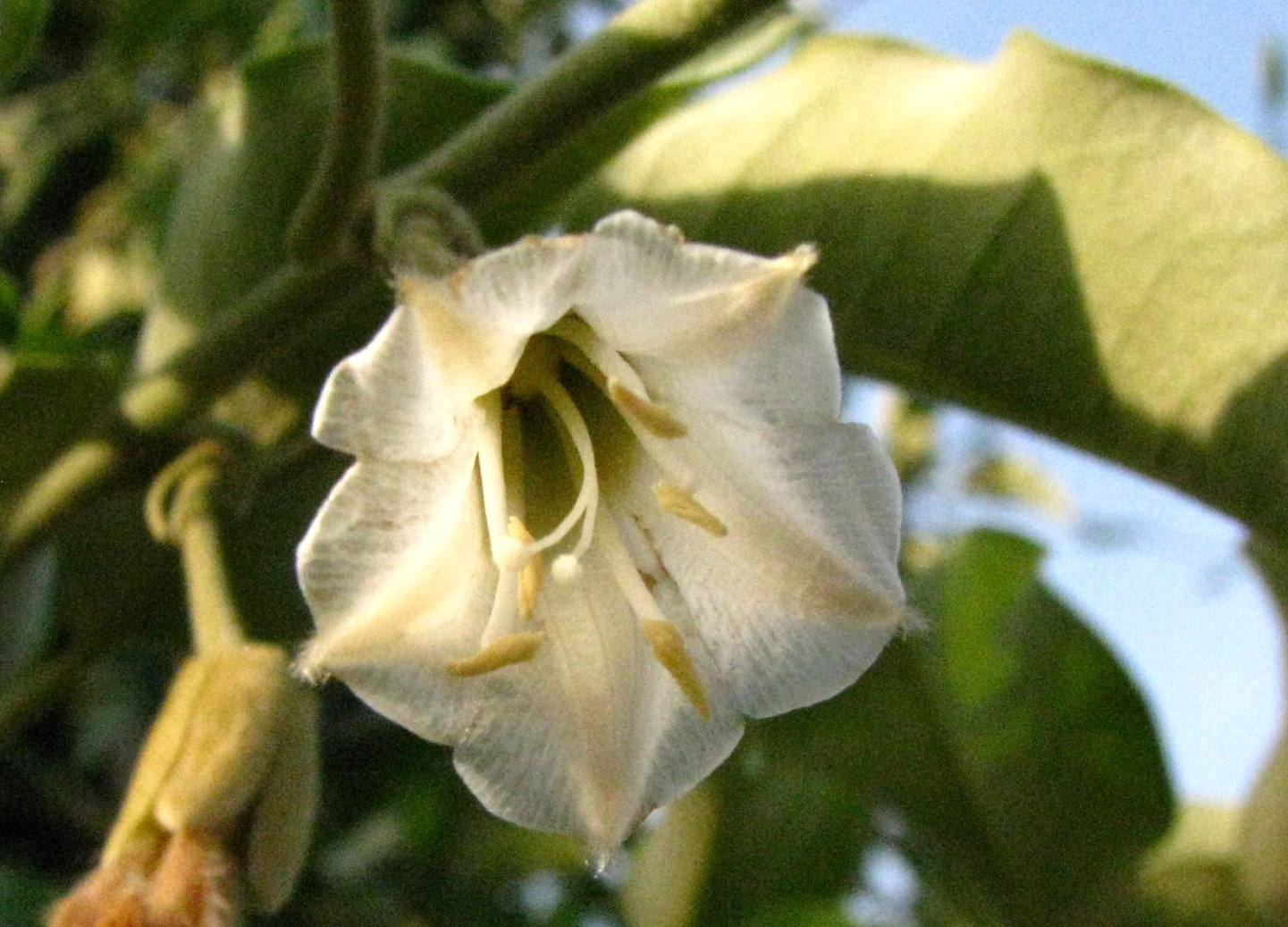
Funnel-shaped white petals and reproductive structures

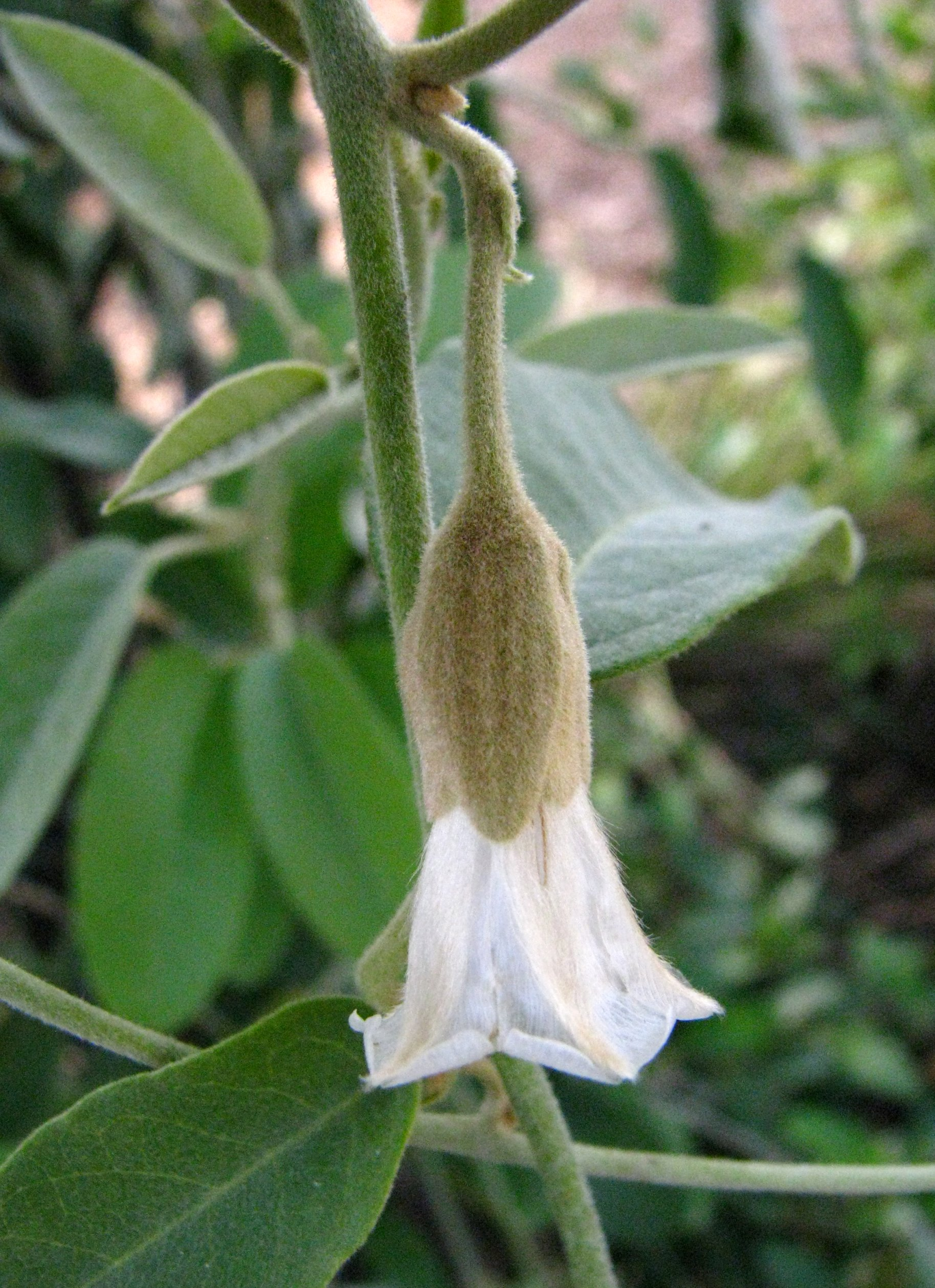
Flower

Bonamia menziesii is a woody vine that can grow up to 10 m (33 ft) in length. The plant produces twining stems that climb over trees or sprawl across the ground. Its leaves are simple, alternate, and elliptic to oblong, with a leathery texture and fine hairs on the underside. They range from 3–9 cm (1.2–3.5 in) in length and 1–4 cm (0.39–1.57 in) in width. The flowers are small, funnel-shaped, and light to dark blue, with five united petals forming a tubular corolla, typical of the Convolvulaceae family. The fruit is a capsule containing a few seeds dispersed by wind and water. Its leaves are simple, alternating, elliptic to oblong in form, with a leathery texture and a thin covering of hairs on the underside.

== Distribution and habitat ==
Bonamia menziesii is endemic to six of the main Hawaiian Islands: Oʻahu, Maui, Hawaiʻi, Molokaʻi, Lānaʻi, and Kauaʻi. It thrives in dry to mesic forests at elevations between 150 and 625 m (492 and 2,051 ft). The plant typically grows on steep slopes, cliff edges, and occasionally on well-drained flat ground.

== Conservation issues ==
Habitat loss from urbanization, agricultural development, and invasive plant species, such as fountain grass (Cenchrus setaceus) and Christmas berry (Schinus terebinthifolia), has greatly reduced the species' range. Non-native animals like goats and pigs further damage habitats by trampling vegetation and eating young plants.

Conservation strategies include fencing off critical habitat to prevent animal damage, cultivating seedlings in botanical gardens, and reintroducing them into protected areas. While these efforts have shown some promise, habitat degradation continues to pose a major challenge.

Low seed viability in the wild contributes to the species' decline.

== Human use ==
Although there is limited documentation of traditional Hawaiian uses for Bonamia menziesii, its presence in native forests suggests it was part of an ecosystem that supported cultural practices such as the collection of medicinal plants, canoe-building materials, and fibers.
