= Bonamia fruticosa =

Scientific classification
- Kingdom: Plantae
- Clade: Tracheophytes
- Clade: Angiosperms
- Clade: Eudicots
- Clade: Asterids
- Order: Solanales
- Family: Convolvulaceae
- Genus: Bonamia
- Species: B. fruticosa

Binomial name
- Bonamia fruticosa R.W.Johnson

Species of flowering plant

Bonamia fruticosa is a shrub in the family Convolvulaceae.

The shrub in the Kimberley region of Western Australia.
