= Johannes Gottfried Hallier =

German botanist (1868–1932)

Johannes (Hans) Gottfried Hallier (6 July 1868 – 10 March 1932) was a German botanist born in Jena.

He studied botany and zoology at the University of Jena under Christian Ernst Stahl (1848–1919) and Ernst Haeckel (1834–1919), and continued his studies at the Ludwig-Maximilians-Universität München under Ludwig Radlkofer (1829–1927) and Richard Hertwig (1850–1937). From 1893 until 1897, he was based at the Buitenzorg Botanical Garden in Java.

In 1894, Hallier became the second European to climb Mount Kelam (after a certain Dr. Gürtler) and the first to collect specimens of the pitcher plant Nepenthes clipeata. He ascended the summit 5 times in January and February of that year. After his return to Germany, he served as an assistant at the Botanical Institute at the Ludwig-Maximilians-Universität München. Beginning in 1898, Hallier worked at the Botanical Museum in Hamburg.

From 1903 to 1904 he took part in a scientific expedition to India, Ceylon and Maritime Southeast Asia. From 1908 to 1922, Hallier was a curator at the Rijksherbarium in Leiden.

He died on 10 March 1932 in Oegstgeest, Netherlands.

He is credited for introducing a phylogenetic classification of flowering plants that became known as the "Hallier system". He published several works on the botany of the Dutch East Indies (now Indonesia), including treatises on the flora of Borneo.

Hallier is commemorated in the scientific name of a species of lizard, Tytthoscincus hallieri.

== Selected writings ==
- Indonesische Acanthaceen, 1897 - Acanthaceae native to Indonesia. (in German).
- Die indonesischen Aeschynanthusarten des Herbariums zu Buitenzorg, 1897 - Indonesian Aeschynanthus types from the Buitenzorg herbaria. (in German).
- Zur Convolvulaceenflora Amerika's, 1899 - American Convolvulaceae. (in German).
- Neue Vorschläge zur botanischen Nomenklatur, 1905 - New proposal involving botanical nomenclature. (in German).

== Bibliography ==
- Singh, Gurcharan (2004). Plant Systematics. Science Publishers. ISBN 978-1-57808-351-0.
- Hallier, Hans (July 1905). "Provisional scheme of the natural (phylogenetic) system of flowering plants". New Phytologist. 4 (7): 151–162. Bibcode:1905NewPh...4..151H. doi:10.1111/j.1469-8137.1905.tb05894.x. hdl:2027/hvd.32044107266454.
- Hallier H (1912). "L'origine et le système phylétique des angiospermes exposés à l'aide de leur arbre généalogique". Archives Néerlandaises des Sciences Exactes et Naturelles, Série III. B. 1: 146–234. (in French).
- Hallier H (1893). "Versuch einer natürlichen Gleiderung der Convolvulaceen auf morphologischer und anatomischer Grundlage". Botanische Jahrbücher für Systematik, Pflanzengeschichte und Pflanzgeographie 16: 453–591. (in German).
- Stefanović S, Krueger L, Olmstead RG (1 September 2002). "Monophyly of the Convolvulaceae and circumscription of their major lineages based on DNA sequences of multiple chloroplast loci". American Journal of Botany. 89 (9): 1510–1522. doi:10.3732/ajb.89.9.1510. PMID 21665753.

== Source ==
Parts of this article are based on a translation of an equivalent article at the German Wikipedia.
