= Simorangkir =

Batak surname originating in Indonesia

Simorangkir is one of Toba Batak clans originating in North Sumatra, Indonesia. People of this clan bear the clan's name as their surname. Notable people of this clan include:

- Bintang Simorangkir (born 1943), Indonesian diplomat
- Johannes Chrisos Tomus Simorangkir (1922-1991), Indonesian politician
- Sari Simorangkir (born 1975), Indonesian singer
