= Padang State Polytechnics =

- Politeknik Negeri Padang
- Logo of Padang State Polytechnics
- Motto: Think Academically, Act Professionally, Behave Nobly
- Type: Public university
- Established: March 12, 1985; Initiated; October 5, 1987; Anniversary / Dies Natalis
- Affiliations: Andalas University (until October 6, 2012)
- Director: Revalin Herdianto
- Location: Limau Manis Campus, Padang, West Sumatra, Indonesia; 0.914°S 100.467°E
- Campus: Limau Manis
- Colors: Orange
- Nickname: PNP
- Website: www.pnp.ac.id

Padang State Polytechnics (Indonesian: Politeknik Negeri Padang), formerly named: Andalas State Polytechnics (or Andalas Polytechnics (Indonesian: Politeknik Negeri Andalas) and Polytechnics of Andalas University (Indonesian: Politeknik Universitas Andalas)) is a higher education institution in Padang, West Sumatra, Indonesia. The current director is Revalin Herdianto.

== Overview ==
Andalas State Polytechnics provides vocational education aimed at granting Expert associate degrees (Indonesian: Ahli Madya or A.Md.).

The dynamic curriculum is designed according to the needs of the industry and commerce sectors.

== Studies and study programmes ==
There are 20 Diploma-3 study programmes, 11 Diploma-4 study programmes, and 1 Applied Master's program.

== Departments and Study Programs ==
There are 7 Departments, 12 D3 Study Programs, and 10 D4 Study Programs (Engineering and Business) at Padang State Polytechnics, including:

=== Departments ===
Engineering	Business
Electrical Engineering	Business Administration
Mechanical Engineering	Accounting
Civil Engineering	English
Information Technology	

=== D3 Study Programs ===
Engineering	Business
Mechanical Engineering	Business Administration
Civil Engineering	Accounting
Electrical Engineering	English
Electronics Engineering D3	Travel & Tourism Business
Telecommunication Engineering D3	
Computer Engineering	
Heavy Equipment Engineering	
Informatics Management	

=== D4 Study Programs ===
Engineering	Business
Electronics Engineering D4	Accounting
Irrigation & Swamp Planning Engineering	English
Road and Bridge Design	
Construction Engineering Management	
Manufacturing Engineering	
Telecommunication Engineering D4	
Software Engineering Technology	
Electrical Installation Engineering Technology	

Specifically for the Diploma 4 program, the academic degree awarded is S.Tr (Applied Bachelor).Permendikbud No.154 of 2014 concerning Fields of Science and Technology and Academic Degrees for Higher Education Graduates

=== Applied Master's / Postgraduate Study Programs ===
Following the development of applied master's degree programs at other vocational polytechnics in Indonesia, the first postgraduate program at Padang State Polytechnics was opened on 19 May 2020, starting with the Applied Master's in Accounting Information Systems study program.
