= Budi Putra =

Indonesian journalist writer

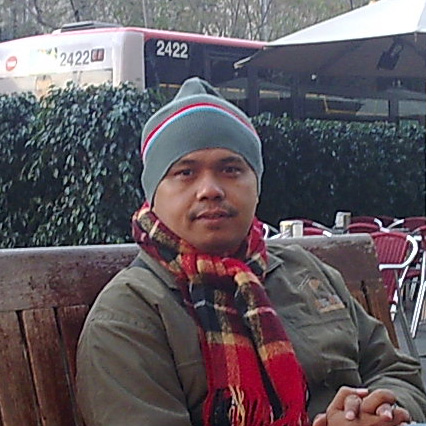
- Born: 12 September 1972 (age 53); Payakumbuh, West Sumatra, Indonesia
- Occupation: Journalist Writer

Budi Putra (born 12 September 1972) is a technology journalist based in Jakarta, Indonesia, who works for Collab Asia. His previous positions were Associate Vice President of Content for Bukalapak, Head of Digital for RGE Indonesia, Chief Executive Officer at The Jakarta Post Digital, advisor at Singapore-based video streaming company Viki., and Country Editor at Yahoo! Indonesia.

Prior to joining Yahoo! as Country Editor for Indonesia in October 2009, he worked as editor for Koran Tempo Daily and Tempo Interactive. After resigning from Tempo in March 2007, Budi writes tech posts for SlashPhone and runs a Jakarta-based Asia Blogging Network.

Budi Putra was also a staff writer for English-language CNET Asia and the Jakarta Post. Budi has written four books on technology in Indonesian.

== Education ==
Born in Payakumbuh, West Sumatra of the Minangkabau land, Budi graduated with a BA in history from Andalas University in Padang, West Sumatra and earned a master's degree in the Communications Management at the University of Indonesia in Jakarta.

== Books ==
(all in Indonesian):

- Sejarah Masa Depan [The Future History] (Pustaka MM, 2000).
- Imperium Digital: Pusaran Budaya Abad 21 [The Digital Empire: A Turning Point of the 21st Century] (Pustaka MM-Cisco Systems, 2001).
- Planet Seluler: Ketika Teknologi Bergerak Mengubah Hidup Kita [The Planet of Cellular: How the Mobile Technology Changed Our Life] (Jakarta: Logicom Publications, June 2004).
- Planet Internet: Jaringan Pintar yang Mengubah Dunia [The Internet Planet: Smart Network that Changed the World] (Jakarta: Logicom Publications, December 2005).
- Planet Digital: Maneuver CDMA di Indonesia [The Planet of Digital: CDMA Maneuver in Indonesia] (Jakarta: Logicom Publications, Agustus 2006).
