= Christian University of Indonesia =

Indonesian university

Universitas Kristen Indonesia
- Universitas Kristen Indonesia
- Motto: Melayani Bukan Dilayani (To Serve not To Be Served)
- Type: Private
- Established: October 15, 1953
- Religious affiliation: Protestant
- Rector: Dhaniswara K. Harjono
- Location: Jakarta, Indonesia
- Campus: Jakarta — Campus Diponegoro; Jakarta — Campus Cawang, 17.4 acres (7.0 ha)
- Colors: Dark blue, yellow, and white
- Affiliations: Association Of Christian Universities And Colleges In Asia (ACUCA)
- Website: uki.ac.id

The Christian University of Indonesia (Indonesian: Universitas Kristen Indonesia) abbreviated as UKI, is a private university located in Jakarta, Indonesia. It was established on October 15, 1953, with its main campus – Campus A – located in Central Jakarta. Campus B is in Cawang, East Jakarta.

The university comprises two tertiary levels of education, undergraduate and postgraduate.

== History ==
=== Founding and early history ===
Shortly after the independence of Indonesia on August 17, 1945, national figures who were also leaders in the Indonesian Christian community were compelled to establish The Church Council of Indonesia (DGI: Dewan Gereja Indonesia).

DGI formed a commission to assess the importance of establishing a university, led by I.P. Simandjuntak. As the result, DGI issued a resolution of Universiteit Kristen (a Christian-based-faith university) on June 30, 1953. The resolution, signed by W.J. Rumambi as the Secretary General of DGI in general session from June 20–30, 1953, asked all churches and Christian people in Indonesia to help the completion of Universiteit Kristen morally or financially.

Indonesian Christian leaders Todung Sutan Gunung Mulia, Yap Thiam Hien, and Benjamin Thomas Philip Sigar, on behalf of the churches incorporated in DGI, established a Christian university of Indonesia (Yayasan Universitas Kristen Indonesia) on July 18, 1953. Its membership was expanded with the support of Elviannus Katoppo, Ong Jan Hong, Aminudin Pohan, Seri Condar Nainggolan, Benjamin Prawirohadmodjo, Komarlin Tjakraatmadja, G. A. Siwabessy, Tan Tek Heng, and J.C.T. Simorangkir. Three months later, on October 15, 1953, Universitas Kristen Indonesia was officially established with the faculties of Language and Philosophy, and Economics. During those first days, campus life and administration were held at HSK on Jalan Diponegoro 86 and at three apartments on Jalan Salemba 10.

The Faculty of Law was created in 1956, Medicine in 1962, Engineering in 1963, and Social and Political Science in 1994.
