= Sympatry =

Coexistence of different taxa in the same environment

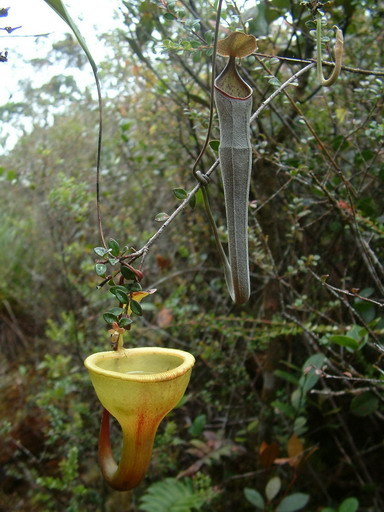
Sympatric pitcher plants, Nepenthes jamban (left) and Nepenthes lingulata (right) in Sumatran upper montane forest

In biology, two closely related species or populations are considered sympatric when they exist in the same geographic area and thus frequently encounter each other. An initially interbreeding population that splits into two or more distinct species sharing a common range exemplifies sympatric speciation. Such speciation may be a product of reproductive isolation — which prevents hybrid offspring from being viable or able to reproduce, thereby reducing gene flow — that results in genetic divergence. Sympatric speciation may, but need not, arise through secondary contact, which refers to speciation or divergence in allopatry followed by range expansions leading to an area of sympatry. Sympatric species or taxa in secondary contact may or may not interbreed.

== Types of populations ==
Four main types of population pairs exist in nature. Sympatric populations (or species) contrast with parapatric populations, which contact one another in adjacent but not shared ranges and do not interbreed; peripatric species, which are separated only by areas in which neither organism occurs; and allopatric species, which occur in entirely distinct ranges that are neither adjacent nor overlapping. Allopatric populations isolated from one another by geographical factors (e.g., mountain ranges or bodies of water) may experience genetic—and, ultimately, phenotypic—changes in response to their varying environments. These may drive allopatric speciation, which is arguably the dominant mode of speciation.

== Evolving definitions and controversy ==
The lack of geographic isolation as a definitive barrier between sympatric species has yielded controversy among ecologists, biologists, botanists, and zoologists regarding the validity of the term. As such, researchers have long debated the conditions under which sympatry truly applies, especially with respect to parasitism. Because parasitic organisms often inhabit multiple hosts during a life cycle, evolutionary biologist Ernst Mayr stated that internal parasites existing within different hosts demonstrate allopatry, not sympatry. Today, however, many biologists consider parasites and their hosts to be sympatric (see examples below). Conversely, zoologist Michael J. D. White considered two populations sympatric if genetic interbreeding was viable within the habitat overlap. This may be further specified as sympatry occurring within one deme; that is, reproductive individuals must be able to locate one another in the same population in order to be sympatric.

Others question the ability of sympatry to result in complete speciation: until recently, many researchers considered it nonexistent, doubting that selection alone could create disparate, but not geographically separated, species. In 2003, biologist Karen McCoy suggested that sympatry can act as a mode of speciation only when "the probability of mating between two individuals depend[s] [solely] on their genotypes, [and the genes are] dispersed throughout the range of the population during the period of reproduction". In essence, sympatric speciation does require very strong forces of natural selection to be acting on heritable traits, as there is no geographic isolation to aid in the splitting process. Yet, recent research has begun to indicate that sympatric speciation is not as uncommon as was once assumed.

== Syntopy ==
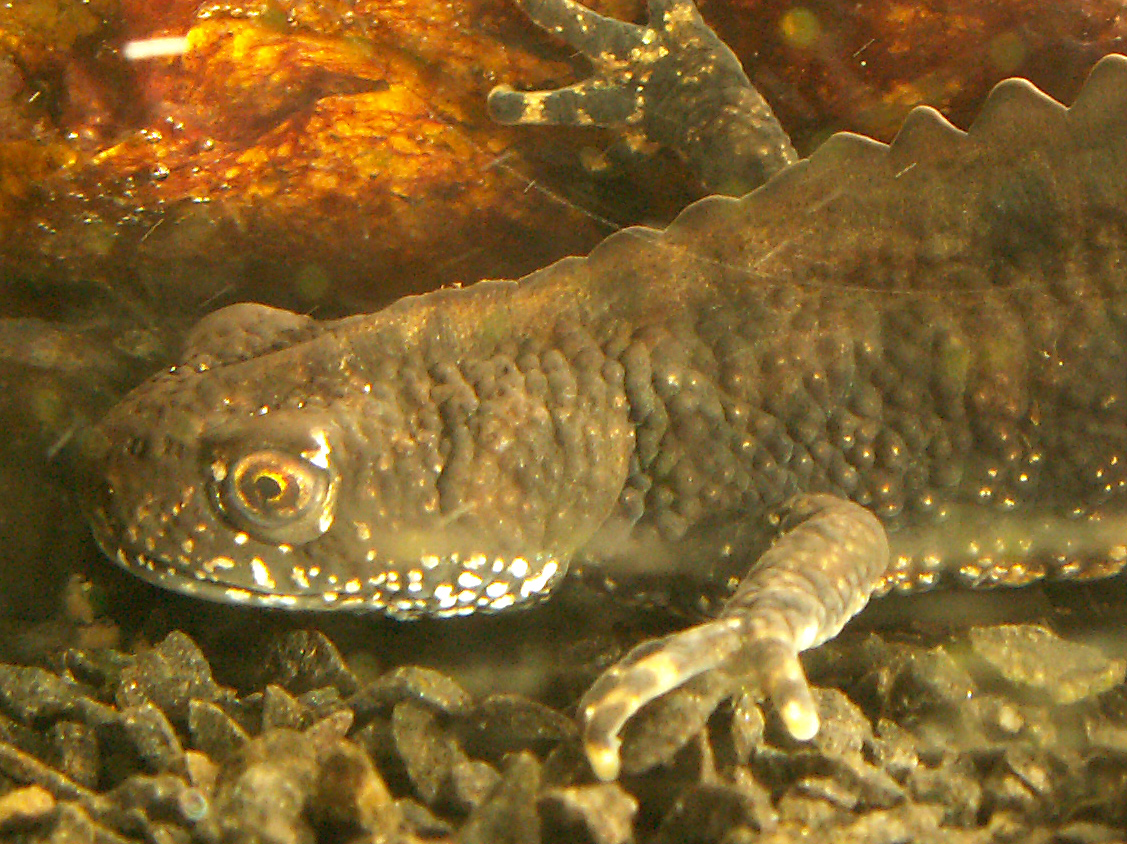
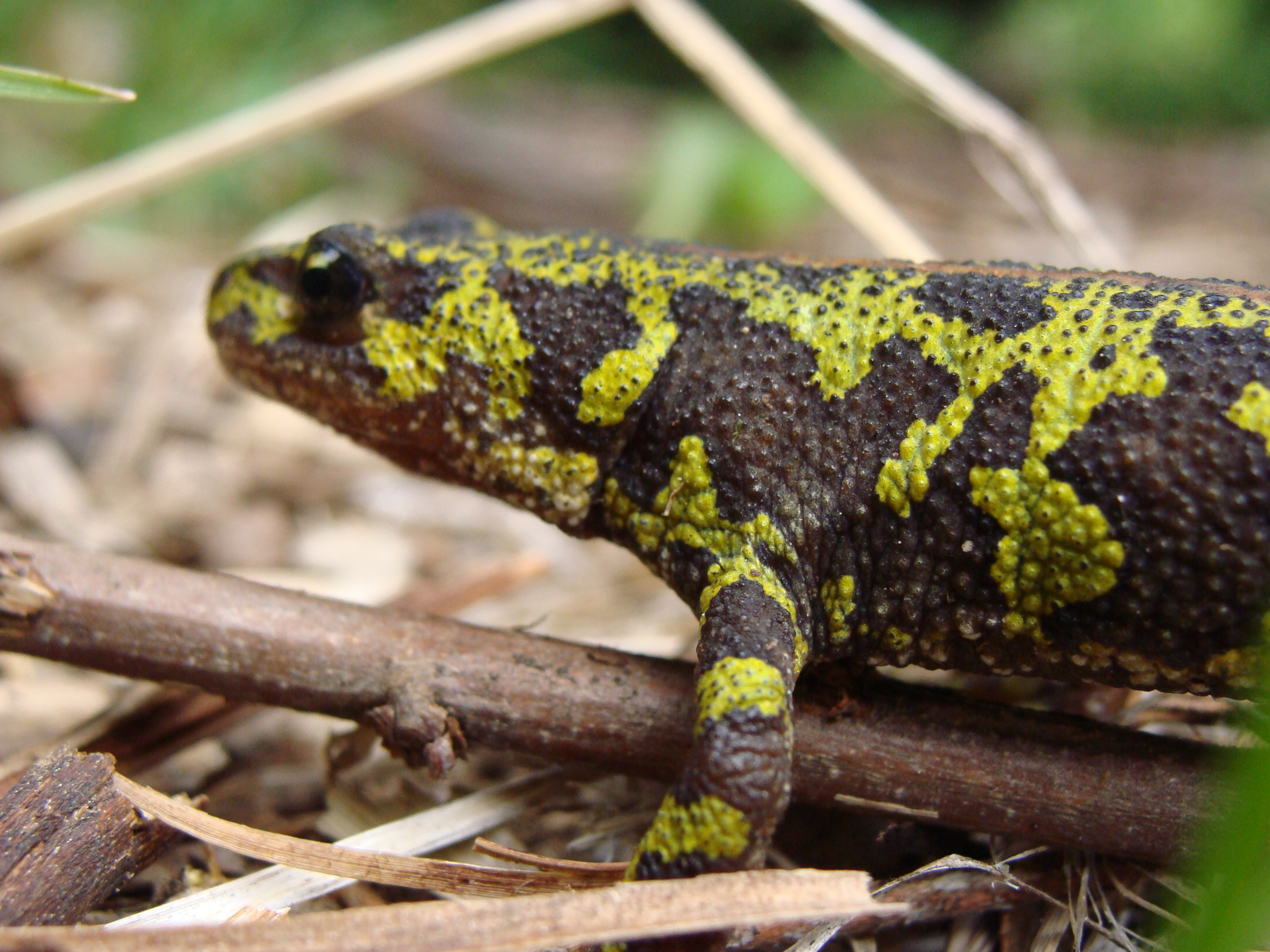
The northern crested newt (above) and the marbled newt (down) are sympatric in western France, but only rarely share the same breeding ponds in syntopy.

Syntopy is a special case of sympatry. It means the joint occurrence of two species in the same habitat at the same time. Just as the broader term sympatry, "syntopy" is used especially for close species that might hybridise or even be sister species. Sympatric species occur together in the same region, but do not necessarily share the same localities as syntopic species do. Areas of syntopy are of interest because they allow to study how similar species may coexist without outcompeting each other.

As an example, the two bat species Myotis auriculus and M. evotis were found to be syntopic in North America. In contrast, the marbled newt and the northern crested newt have a large sympatric range in western France, but differ in their habitat preferences and only rarely occur syntopically in the same breeding ponds.

== Sympatric speciation ==
Different modes of speciation

The lack of geographic constraint in isolating sympatric populations implies that the emerging species avoid interbreeding via other mechanisms. Before speciation is complete, two diverging populations may still produce viable offspring. As speciation progresses, isolating mechanisms – such as gametic incompatibility that renders fertilization of the egg impossible – are selected for in order to increase the reproductive divide between the two populations.

=== Species discrimination ===
Sympatric groups frequently show a greater ability to discriminate between their own species and other closely related species than do allopatric groups. This is shown in the study of hybrid zones. It is also apparent in the differences in levels of prezygotic isolation (by factors that prevent formation of a viable zygote) in both sympatric and allopatric populations. There are two main theories regarding this process: 1) differential fusion, which suggests that only populations with a keen ability to discriminate between species will persist in sympatry; and 2) character displacement, which implies that distinguishing characteristics will be heightened in areas where the species co-occur in order to facilitate discrimination.

==== Reinforcement ====
Reinforcement is the process by which natural selection reinforces reproductive isolation. In sympatry, reinforcement increases species discrimination and sexual adaptation in order to avoid maladaptive hybridization and encourage speciation. If hybrid offspring are either sterile or less-fit than non-hybrid offspring, mating between members of two different species will be selected against. Natural selection decreases the probability of such hybridization by selecting for the ability to identify mates of one's own species from those of another species.

==== Reproductive character displacement ====
Reproductive character displacement strengthens the reproductive barriers between sympatric species by encouraging the divergence of traits that are crucial to reproduction. Divergence is frequently distinguished by assortative mating between individuals of the two species. For example, divergence in the mating signals of two species will limit hybridization by reducing one's ability to identify an individual of the second species as a potential mate. Support for the reproductive character displacement hypothesis comes from observations of sympatric species in overlapping habitats in nature. Increased prezygotic isolation, which is associated with reproductive character displacement, has been observed in cicadas of genus Magicicada, stickleback fish, and the flowering plants of the genus Phlox.

==== Differential fusion ====
An alternative explanation for species discrimination in sympatry is differential fusion. This hypothesis states that of the many species have historically come into contact with one another, the only ones that persist in sympatry (and thus are seen today) are species with strong mating discrimination. On the other hand, species lacking strong mating discrimination are assumed to have fused while in contact, forming one distinct species.

Differential fusion is less widely recognized than character displacement, and several of its implications are refuted by experimental evidence. For example, differential fusion implies greater postzygotic isolation among sympatric species, as this functions to prevent fusion between the species. However, Coyne and Orr found equal levels of postzygotic isolation among sympatric and allopatric species pairs in closely related Drosophila. Nevertheless, differential fusion remains a possible, though not complete, contributor to species discrimination.

== Examples ==
Sympatry has been increasingly evidenced in current research. Because of this, sympatric speciation – which was once highly debated among researchers – is progressively gaining credibility as a viable form of speciation.

=== Orca: partial sympatry ===
Several distinct types of killer whale (Orcinus orca), which are characterized by an array of morphological and behavioral differences, live in sympatry throughout the North Atlantic, North Pacific and Antarctic oceans. In the North Pacific, three whale populations – called "transient", "resident", and "offshore" – demonstrate partial sympatry, crossing paths with relative frequency. The results of recent genetic analyses using mtDNA indicate that this is due to secondary contact, in which the three types encountered one another following the bidirectional migration of "offshore" and "resident" whales between the North Atlantic and North Pacific. Partial sympatry in these whales is, therefore, not the result of speciation. Furthermore, killer whale populations that consist of all three types have been documented in the Atlantic, evidencing that interbreeding occurs among them. Thus, secondary contact does not always result in total reproductive isolation, as has often been predicted.

=== Great spotted cuckoo and magpie: brood parasitism ===
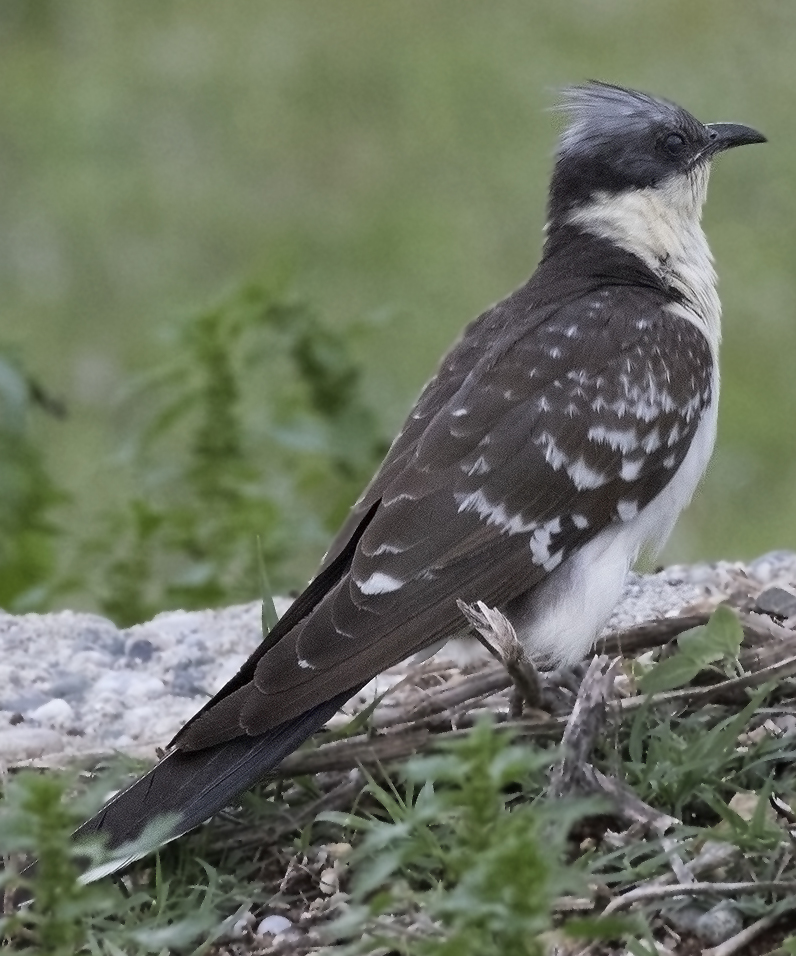
Great spotted cuckoo, sympatric with the magpie

The parasitic great spotted cuckoo (Clamator glandarius) and its magpie host, both native to Southern Europe, are completely sympatric species. However, the duration of their sympatry varies with location. For example, great spotted cuckoos and their magpie hosts in Hoya de Gaudix, southern Spain, have lived in sympatry since the early 1960s, while species in other locations have more recently become sympatric. Great spotted cuckoos, when in South Africa, are sympatric with at least 8 species of starling and 2 crows, pied crow and Cape crow.

The great spotted cuckoo exhibits brood parasitism by laying a mimicked version of the magpie egg in the magpie's nest. Since cuckoo eggs hatch before magpie eggs, magpie hatchlings must compete with cuckoo hatchlings for resources provided by the magpie mother. This relationship between the cuckoo and the magpie in various locations can be characterized as either recently sympatric or anciently sympatric. The results of an experiment by Soler and Moller (1990) showed that in areas of ancient sympatry (species in cohabitation for many generations), magpies were more likely to reject most of the cuckoo eggs, as these magpies had developed counter-adaptations that aid in identification of egg type. In areas of recent sympatry, magpies rejected comparatively fewer cuckoo eggs. Thus, sympatry can cause coevolution, by which both species undergo genetic changes due to the selective pressures that one species exerts on the other.

=== Acromyrmex ant: isolation of fungal gardens ===
Leafcutter ants protect and nourish various species of fungus as a source of food in a system known as ant-fungus mutualism. Leafcutter ants belonging to the genus Acromyrmex are known for their mutualistic relationship with Basidiomycete fungi. Ant colonies are closely associated with their fungus colonies, and may have co-evolved with a consistent vertical lineage of fungi in individual colonies. Ant populations defend against the horizontal transmission of foreign fungi to their fungal colony, as this transmission may lead to competitive stress on the local fungal garden. Invaders are identified and removed by the ant colony, inhibiting competition and fungal interbreeding. This active isolation of individual populations helps maintain the genetic purity of the fungal colony, and this mechanism may lead to sympatric speciation within a shared habitat.

== See also ==
- Evolutionary pressure
- Ring species
- Selection
- Pieris oleracea

== Bibliography ==
- Bot, A.N.M.; Rehner, S.A. & Boomsma, J.J. (October 2001). "Partial Incompatibility between Ants and Symbiotic Fungi in Two Sympatric Species of Acromyrmex Leaf-Cutting Ants". Evolution. 55 (10): 1980–1991. Bibcode:2001Evolu..55.1980B. doi:10.1111/j.0014-3820.2001.tb01315.x. JSTOR 2680446. PMID 11761059. S2CID 25817643.
- Coyne, Jerry A. & Orr, H. Allen (March 1989). "Patterns of Speciation in Drosophila". Evolution. 43 (2): 362–381. Bibcode:1989Evolu..43..362C. doi:10.1111/j.1558-5646.1989.tb04233.x. JSTOR 2409213. PMID 28568554. S2CID 1678429.
- Dieckmann, U. & Doebeli, M. (July 1999). "On the origin of species by sympatric speciation" (PDF). Nature. 400 (6742): 354–357. Bibcode:1999Natur.400..354D. doi:10.1038/22521. PMID 10432112. S2CID 4301325.
- Foote, A.D.; Morin, P.A.; Durban, J.W.; et al. (September 2011). "Out of the pacific and back again: insights into the matrilineal history of pacific killer whale ecotypes". PLOS ONE. 6 (9) e24980. Bibcode:2011PLoSO...624980F. doi:10.1371/journal.pone.0024980. PMC 3176785. PMID 21949818.
- Futuyma, D.J. (2009). Evolution (2nd ed.). Sunderland, Massachusetts: Sinauer Associates. ISBN 978-0-87893-223-8.
- McCoy, K.D. (September 2003). "Sympatric speciation in parasites – what is sympatry?". Trends in Parasitology. 19 (9): 400–404. doi:10.1016/S1471-4922(03)00194-6. PMC 7129588. PMID 12957516.
- Noor, M.A.F. (November 1999). "Reinforcement and other consequences of sympatry" (PDF). Heredity. 83 (5): 503–508. Bibcode:1999Hered..83..503N. doi:10.1038/sj.hdy.6886320. PMID 10620021. S2CID 26625194.
- Roberts, A.; Tarboton, W. (2011). Roberts' Guide to the Nests and Eggs of Southern African Birds. John Voelcker Bird Book Fund. ISBN 978-0-620-50629-8.
- Soler, M. & Moller, A.P. (February 1990). "Duration of sympatry and coevolution between the great spotted cuckoo and its magpie host". Nature. 343 (6260): 748–750. Bibcode:1990Natur.343..748S. doi:10.1038/343748a0. S2CID 4326684.
