= Johannes Chrisos Tomus Simorangkir =

Indonesian politician

Mr. Johannes Chrisos Tomus Simorangkir
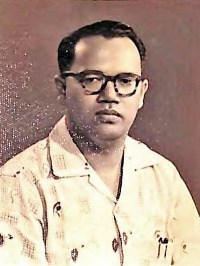

Member of the Constitutional Assembly of Indonesia
- In office 9 November 1956 – 5 July 1959
- President: Sukarno

Member of the People's Representative Council of Mutual Assistance
- In office 1 February 1967 – 28 October 1971
- President: Sukarno; Suharto

Head of Indonesian Christian Party
- In office 11 February 1962 – 11 January 1973
- President: Sukarno; Suharto

Rector of Christian University of Indonesia
- In office 1962–1966
- President: Sukarno

Personal details
- Born: February 17, 1922 Tarutung, North Sumatra, Dutch East Indies
- Died: July 5, 1991 (aged 69) Cikini Hospital, Cikini, Menteng, Jakarta, Indonesia
- Party: Indonesian Christian Party
- Spouse: Bungaran Simorangkir
- Children: 6

Johannes Chrisos Tomus Simorangkir (February 17, 1922 – July 5, 1991) was an MP of Indonesia from the Indonesian Christian Party. He was also the Member of the People's Representative Council of Mutual Assistance from 1967 until 1971, and the head of Indonesian Christian Party from 1962 until 1973.

== Early life ==
Simorangkir was born on 17 February 1922 in Tarutung, North Sumatra. He began his studies at the Tarutung Elementary School in 1937. After finishing his studies, he moved to Surakarta. In Surakarta, he studied for his Junior High School at the Hollands Inlandsche Kweekschool in 1942. He moved again to Jakarta, in which he became the student at the Law Faculty of the University of Indonesia. He graduated from the university in 1953. After obtaining a bachelor's degree, he studied again thirty years later at the Andalas University in Padang, and earned a magister degree.

== Organization ==
He began his career during his university years by joining the Indonesian Christian Youth Movement (PPKI) and the Association of Indonesian Christian Intelligence (PIKI). He became the chairman of PPKI from 1955 until 1965, and the chairman of PIKI from 1963 until 1969.

== Career ==
=== Political career ===
His political career begin when he was elected as the member of the Constitutional Assembly of Indonesia from the Indonesian Christian Party (Parkindo) in the 1955 elections, on which he served from 1956 until 1959. He would later be re-appointed as the member and the head of the Parkindo fraction in the People's Representative Council of Mutual Assistance.

=== Educational career ===
Since 1956, he applied to the University of Indonesia as the Professor of Constitutional Law, with his application always delayed. Without a clear reason, several professors rejected to be his promotor. When Ismail Suny, his former student, became the Professor of the Law Faculty, Simorangkir applied for the position again. The application ended with his rejection.

He began teaching in the military world as the lecturer at the Indonesian National Armed Forces Staff and Command School (SESKO ABRI) from 1978 until 1982. He was also the Rector of Christian University of Indonesia from 1962 until 1966.

== In the National Law Development Agency (BPHN) ==
He entered BPHN since its name was National Law Development Institution in 1958. He became the chairman of BPHN from 1966 until 1982.

== Family ==
Simorangkir was married to Basaria . She was the chairwoman of the Indonesian Christian Women's Association, and the Head of National Daily Board of the 1945 Generation. The marriage resulted in six children.

== Death ==
Simorangkir died on July 5, 1991, at the age of 69. He left a wife, six children, and six grandchildren.
