= Bintang Simorangkir =

Indonesian diplomat (born 1943)

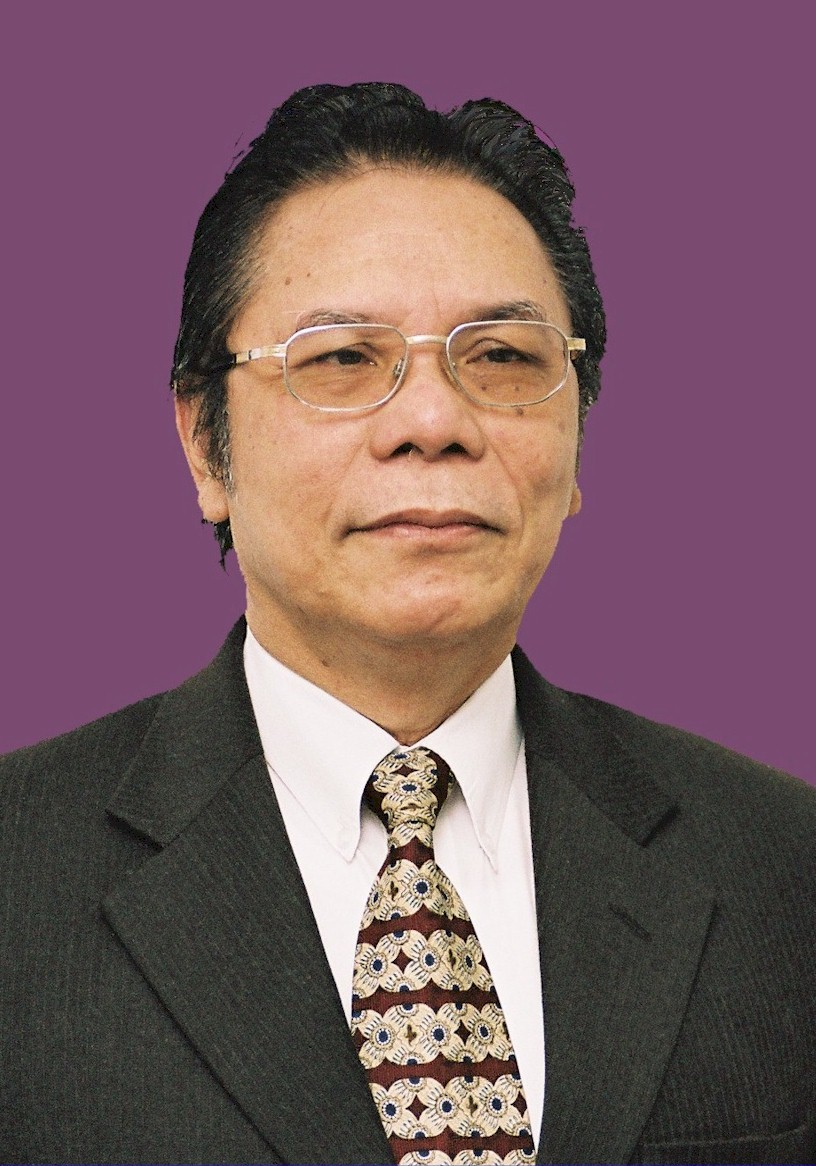

Ambassador of Indonesia to Slovakia
- In office 30 September 2002 – 30 November 2005
- Preceded by: Malikus Suamin
- Succeeded by: Lutfi Rauf

Personal details
- Born: September 15, 1943 (age 82) Tarutung, North Sumatra, Dutch East Indies
- Spouse: Lelly Darmawarince Sitompul
- Children: 4
- Education: Prague University of Economics (M.Sc.)

Bintang Parlindungan H. M. Simorangkir (born 15 September 1943) is an Indonesian career diplomat who was the ambassador to Slovakia from 2002 to 2005. Prior to his appointment, Bintang was the secretary of the foreign department's research and development agency. Throughout his career, Bintang was posted at Indonesian embassies in London, Bonn, Prague, Thailand, Washington, and Madrid.

== Early life and education ==
Bintang was born in Tarutung on 15 September 1943. He was raised in a modest family led by his father, a disciplined teacher who graduated from a school established by German missionaries (Zendingsschool) in Sipoholon, Tarutung. Due to the nature of his father's teaching assignments, the family relocated frequently, causing Bintang to change schools multiple times. He attended elementary school up to the second grade in Tarutung before moving to Sibolga, where he completed his elementary education. The family later moved to Medan, where Bintang completed both his junior high and senior high school education. Upon completing his education, Bintang wanted to work outside Medan rather than pursuing a college education out of a motivation of alleviating his father's financial burden, whose income as a teacher supported the entire household. This ambition brought him to Jakarta. After being accepted into the foreign department, he received his master's degree from the Prague University of Economics while being posted there.

== Diplomatic career ==
Bintang began his career at the foreign department in 1976. His path into diplomacy started when he frequented the foreign department's office, where he learned from a local vendor that visitors were securing papers to work abroad. Inspired by this prospect, he gathered information and submitted his application. Despite being open heavily dismissed and mocked by another applicant due to his humble attire and simple background, Bintang passed the selection process and was accepted into the department.

His first overseas posting came in 1981, when he was stationed at the embassy in London, where he interned at the embassy's economic section with the rank of attaché. By the next year, Bintang has already been promoted to home staff with the rank of third secretary. After serving there until 1984, his career within the department continued to progress with a subsequent assignment in Bonn, Germany, where he served in the same section with the diplomatic rank of second secretary. Between 1988 and 1992, Bintang headed the economic section of the embassy in Madrid with the rank of first secretary. He was then reassigned to the economic section of the embassy in Bangkok with the rank of counsellor before being sent to the same department at the embassy in Washington, D.C., United States with the rank of minister counsellor. Bintang and other diplomats stationed there worked to assist the ambassador, Dorodjatun Kuntjoro-Jakti, in securing a bailout agreement from the International Monetary Fund amidst the ongoing financial crisis. The ambassador's wife, Emiwaty, quipped about the abundance of the embassy's Bataknese staffs, including Bintang himself.

Bintang was recalled to the foreign department in 1999 to take up office as the secretary of the foreign department's research and development agency. In early 2002, president Megawati Sukarnoputri nominated him as ambassador to Slovakia. Shortly afterwards, Bintang suffered a stroke and had to be physically supported during his parliamentary assessment in June. He passed the selection and was sworn in on 30 September 2002. He presented his credentials to president Rudolf Schuster on 28 November 2002, during which Schuster emphasized Indonesia's priority status among countries in Asia, and delivered his gratitude for Megawati's visit to the country earlier that year. Bintang continued to be treated for his complications in Bratislava, with his medical bills being paid by the state. As ambassador, Bintang initiated several bilateral breakthroughs to strengthen relations between Indonesia and Slovakia. Under his leadership, the embassy participated for the first time in the world tourism exhibition and the world furniture exhibition. He also organized a world bonsai exhibition that was personally attended by Slovak President Ivan Gašparovič, and established the inaugural Indonesia-Slovakia business meeting. Throughout his career, he participated in dozens of international seminars and conferences before his term ended on 30 November 2005.

== Personal life ==
Bintang is married to Lelly Darmawince Sitompul and has two daughters and two sons. Bintang is fluent in English, Czech, Slovak, Spanish, and Batak language. After his retirement, Bintang resided at the foreign department housing complex in Pondok Aren, and actively participates in the elderly association of the Petukangan Batak Christian Protestant Church.
