= Andalas University =

Public university in West Sumatra, Indonesia

- Universitas Andalas
- Andalas University, Limau Manis campus
- Motto: Untuk kedjajaan bangsa (Indonesian)
- Motto in English: For the glory of the nation
- Type: Public university
- Established: 1955
- Academic affiliations: ASAIHL, AUN, AUAP
- Rector: Dr. Efa Yonnedi, S.E., MPPM, Akt., CA, CRGP.
- Students: 32,000 (2022)
- Location: Padang, West Sumatra, Indonesia
- Campus: Limau Manis Campus Jati Campus Payakumbuh Campus Dharmasraya Campus
Colors
Dark Green
- Website: unand.ac.id
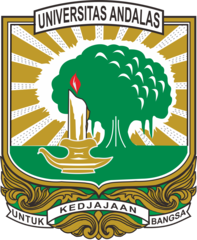

Andalas University (Indonesian: Universitas Andalas, abbreviated Unand or stylized in all caps) is a public research university in Padang, West Sumatra. Andalas is one of the major public institutions of higher learning in Indonesia, and the oldest outside the island of Java. The university is known for its excellence in social sciences and medical program, and has produced numerous distinguished alumni in public and private service. In November 2019, Andalas was ranked fourth best Indonesian research university from a nationwide evaluation conducted by the Ministry of Research and Technology.

== History ==
=== Early years ===
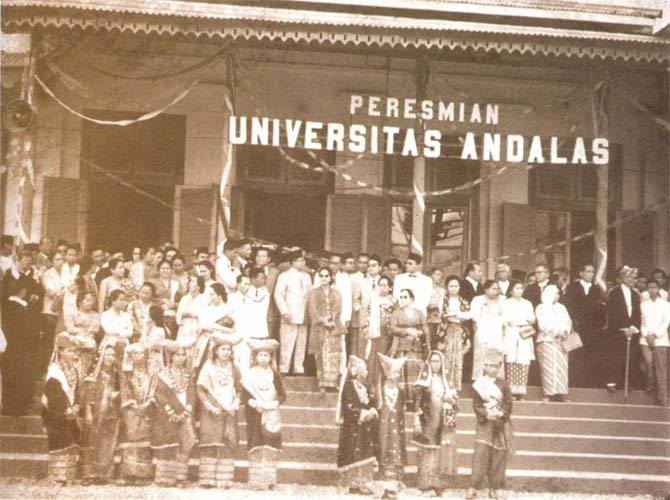
Inauguration of the university in Bukittinggi, September 1956

The idea of an institution of higher learning in West Sumatra has been in since the early years of 20th century, following the rise of modern Indonesian intellectual class, some of them with roots in the island of Sumatra. The Dutch East Indies government did not establish any colleges or polytechnics in Sumatra as they did in Java, forcing many of Sumatran talents to pursue their study away from home, or even overseas.

After the Indonesian independence, the idea became quickly popular among the republican leaders. In 1948, six new academies were established in Bukittinggi: Civil Service Academy (Akademi Pamong Praja), Physical Education Academy (Akademi Pendidikan Jasmani), English "A" Act Program (Akte A Bahasa Inggris), Cadet Academy (Akademi Kadet), and School for Police Inspectors (Sekolah Inspektur Polisi). Following the end of Indonesian National Revolution which saw the seat of power moved around West Sumatra under Emergency Government of the Republic of Indonesia, a plan was dispatched in 1949 to inaugurate a law school in Padang, a medical school in Medan, and a school of economics in Palembang. The national government at that time, however, indefinitely put the plan on hold.

In August 1951, Sriwijaya Foundation (Jajasan Sriwidjaja), a private foundation, established Pancasila Law College (Balai Perguruan Tinggi Hukum Pancasila). Following the lead, the government approved creation of a Teachers' Training College (Perguruan Tinggi Pendidikan Guru) in Batusangkar in October 1954 and a State Agricultural College (Perguruan Tinggi Negeri Pertanian) in Payakumbuh in November 1954, as well as a medical school and school of natural sciences (Fakultas Ilmu Pasti dan Ilmu Pengetahuan Alam) in Bukittinggi in September 1955. All four state-owned colleges were inaugurated by Vice President Mohammad Hatta, a strong proponent of public education and a native West Sumatran himself. Sensing government's support, Sriwijaya turned control of Pancasila College to the regional government of Central Sumatra, turning it into a law faculty (Fakultas Hukum dan Pengetahuan Masyarakat).

The five colleges became founding constituents of Andalas University, inaugurated by Hatta in Bukittinggi on September 13, 1956. Two years later, Rudito Rachmad became the first graduate, receiving a meester in de rechten (Mr.), a degree in law.

=== Revolutionary Government and decline ===
Political turmoil that rocked Indonesia in late 1950s and early 1960s affected the university greatly. First, Vice President Hatta resigned in December 1956, owing to his disagreement with the increasingly autocratic leadership of President Sukarno. Tensions between regional and central government culminated with the formation of Dewan Banteng, a military regime that eventually became part of the Revolutionary Government of the Republic of Indonesia (Pemerintahan Revolusioner Republik Indonesia, widely known as PRRI) in 1958.

Many Andalas professors and students openly supported PRRI, which aims for a greater autonomy for the provinces and for Prime Minister Djuanda Kartawidjaja to resign. At this time, many professors from outside of West Sumatra, including those recruited from overseas, became disillusioned and left their teaching positions to return home or move to other universities in Java. Some PRRI supporters from Java replaced their position, including economist Sumitro Djojohadikusumo, who served as PRRI's trade and communications minister and played an influential role on establishing Andalas's economics department. Subsequent military intervention, brought by General Abdul Haris Nasution and executed on the ground by Colonel Ahmad Yani, destroyed much of Andalas teaching facilities spread in several cities. Lessons were stopped for times until the end of PRRI's rebellion in 1961.

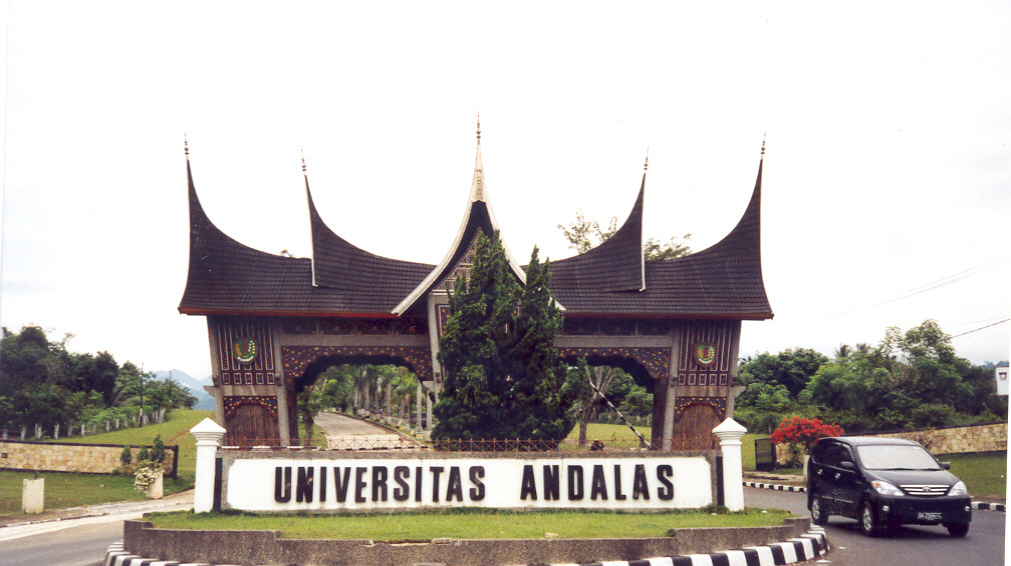
Entrance gate to Limau Manis campus, 2005

=== New Order and modern growth ===
After a turbulent 1950s, Andalas began to reform itself. Led by Rector Harun Al Rasyid Zain, Andalas opened the first animal sciences faculty in Indonesia in October 1963. Its teaching division became Padang Teacher Training and Education Institute (Institut Keguruan dan Ilmu Pendidikan Padang), the predecessor institute of Padang State University.

Beginning in 1970s, Andalas started to consolidate much of its educational facilities in Padang. Some new campuses, like Air Tawar, Jati, Pondok, and Jl. Pancasila were built to accommodate the growing number of students and professors. During the leadership of rectors Busyra Zahir and Mawardi Yunus, new departments were added, including the first engineering and humanities programs. In 1982, Andalas established two non-degree colleges (fakultas non-gelar teknologi): a State Polytechnic (Politeknik Teknologi Unand, today known as Padang State Polytechnic) in Padang and an Agricultural Polytechnic (Politeknik Pertanian, today the Payakumbuh campus of the Faculty of Agricultural Sciences.) Specialist training programs for physicians began in 1984, with surgery, internal medicine, and ophthalmology as the first programs.

On 1992, a Postgraduate Program was established; in 2000, the first doctoral programs in agricultural sciences, law, and animal sciences were introduced, making them as one of the major doctorate-granting university in Indonesia. On 2008, two new faculties, Agricultural Technology and Pharmacy, were established, followed by another four, Public Health, Nursing, Dentistry, and Information Technology in 2012.

== Faculties and School ==
Faculties of the Andalas University
Faculty	Year founded
Faculty of Law	1951
Faculty of Agricultural Sciences	1954
Faculty of Medicine	1955
Faculty of Mathematics and Natural Sciences	1955
Faculty of Economics	1957
Faculty of Animal Sciences	1963
Faculty of Humanities	1982
Faculty of Engineering	1993
Faculty of Social and Political Sciences	1993
Faculty of Pharmacy	2008
Faculty of Agricultural Technology	2008
Faculty of Public Health	2012
Faculty of Information Technology	2012
Faculty of Nursing	2012
Faculty of Dentistry	2012

== Rankings ==
University rankings

Global – Overall
- QS World: =1401+ (2026)
- QS Employability: 701+ (2026)

Regional – Overall
- QS Asia: 396 (2026)

Universitas Andalas (UNAND) consistently ranks among the top universities in Indonesia and is widely recognized as the leading higher education institution in Sumatra.

The QS Asia University Rangkings 2026 has ranks Universitas Andalas as number 77 in South-eastern Asia. Meanwhile, in the QS World University Rankings 2026, the Andalas University ranked in 1401+ globally and ranked twenty-fourth in Indonesia.

In the Times Higher Education World University Rankings 2026, Andalas University is ranked in the range of 1501+ globally.

=== Subject ===
THE World University Rankings by Subject 2026
Subject	Global	National
Arts & humanities	-	-
Business & economics	-	-
Computer science	-	-
Education	-	-
Engineering	1251+	▼15
Law	▲301-350	▼10
Life sciences	1001+	▼10
Medical & Health	1001+	12
Physical sciences	▲1251+	▲16
Psychology	-	-
Social sciences	1001+	15

== Notable people ==
=== Graduates ===
The university has graduated many notable alumni that went to serve a distinguished service in public and private capacities.

Prominent public officials including former Home Affairs Minister and West Sumatra governor Gamawan Fauzi, Administrative Reform Minister Asman Abnur, former Attorney General Basrief Arief, former West Sumatra governor Zainal Bakar, former Bank Indonesia governor Aslim Tadjuddin, and former Elections Commissioner Husni Kamil Manik. Musliar Kasim and Fasli Jalal both served as Deputy Minister of Education. Two Andalas graduates currently sit in Indonesia's highest courts, Takdir Rahmadi in the Supreme Court and Saldi Isra in the Constitutional Court. Other politicians including Mahyeldi Ansharullah, the current Governor of West Sumatra.

Andalas alumni has also gone into top business positions, such as former Bukit Asam CEO Ismet Harmaini, former Semen Gresik and Pertamina CEO Dwi Soetjipto, and founder of Sutan Kasim automotive dealership empire Zairin Kasim. Ricky Elson, inventor of Indonesia's first electric car Selo, holds an engineering degree from Andalas. In media and entertainment, Andalas graduates including The Jakarta Post technology journalist Budi Putra and senior reporter Elprisdat M. Zen. Football coach Indra Sjafri also graduated from Andalas.

=== Faculty members ===
Sumitro Djojohadikusumo, one of Indonesia's most prominent economists and father of politician Prabowo Subianto, served as the first dean of the faculty of economics. Chemistry professor Rahmiana Zein invented the world's fastest method for chromatography. The faculty of law has some of the most prominent scholars on Indonesian criminal and civil jurisprudence, including Isra, Elwi Danil, Yuliandri, and Feri Amsari. Gusti Asnan is an acclaimed scholar of Minangkabau and served as dean of the faculty of humanities.

Three Andalas rectors have served in prominent positions in West Sumatra provincial government. Harun Al Rasyid Zain and Marlis Rahman became governors, while Fachri Achmad was a deputy governor under another Andalas graduate Zainal Bakar. Zain went to serve as Labour and Transmigration Minister.

Notable Andalas University figures include:

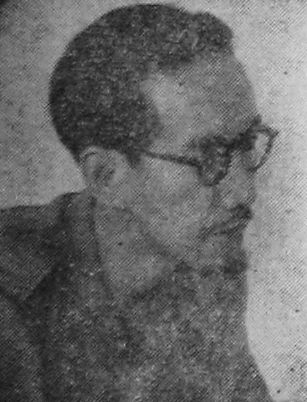
Sumitro Djojohadikusumo, former Finance Minister

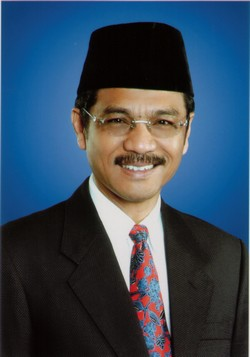
Gamawan Fauzi, former Home Affairs Minister and West Sumatra governor

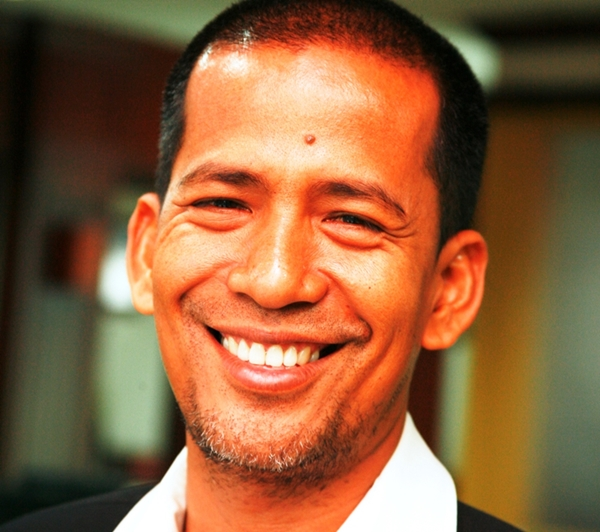
Saldi Isra, associate judge of the Constitutional Court

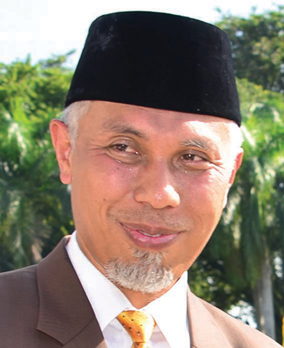
Mahyeldi Ansharullah, West Sumatra governor and former mayor of Padang

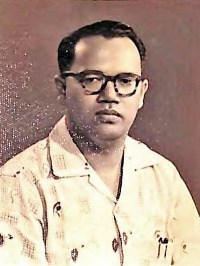
Johannes Chrisos Tomus Simorangkir, member of the Constitutional Assembly of Indonesia and the People's Representative Council of Mutual Assistance
