= Nepenthaceae (2001 monograph) =

2001 monograph by Martin Cheek and Matthew Jebb

Front cover of volume 15 of Flora Malesiana, showing N. northiana

"Nepenthaceae" is a monograph by Martin Cheek and Matthew Jebb on the tropical pitcher plants of Malesia, which encompasses Brunei, Indonesia, Malaysia, Papua New Guinea, the Philippines, and Singapore. It was published in 2001 by the National Herbarium of the Netherlands as the fifteenth volume of the Flora Malesiana series. The species descriptions presented in the monograph are based on the authors' field observations in Borneo, New Guinea, and Peninsular Malaysia, as well as the examination of plant material deposited at 20 herbaria.

== Content ==
Cheek and Jebb recognised 83 species from Malesia, including three nothospecies (N. × hookeriana, N. × kinabaluensis, and N. × trichocarpa) and one "little known species" (N. deaniana). In addition, they mentioned four "excluded species": N. cincta (likely a natural hybrid between N. albomarginata and N. northiana), N. cristata ("a nonsense species based on mixed types"), N. lindleyana (of which the original material could not be located), and N. neglecta (which the authors considered likely to represent N. gracilis).

In "Nepenthaceae", Cheek and Jebb revised several of the taxonomic determinations made in their 1997 monograph, "A skeletal revision of Nepenthes (Nepenthaceae)". They supported Charles Clarke's interpretation of N. borneensis and N. faizaliana in Nepenthes of Borneo, synonymising the former with N. boschiana and restoring the latter as a distinct species, separate from N. stenophylla. In addition, N. philippinensis, which the authors had previously considered a doubtful taxon, was treated as distinct. Of the species described since the preparation of their skeletal revision, Cheek and Jebb accepted N. benstonei, N. lavicola, N. mira, and N. sibuyanensis. However, the authors rejected N. angasanensis, sinking it in synonymy with N. mikei.

=== Species ===
The following taxa are covered in the monograph, with 83 recognised as valid species (including three nothospecies and one "little known species").

1. N. adnata
2. N. alata
3. N. albomarginata
4. N. ampullaria
5. N. argentii
6. N. aristolochioides
7. N. bellii
8. N. benstonei
9. N. bicalcarata
10. N. bongso
11. N. boschiana
12. N. burbidgeae
13. N. burkei
14. N. campanulata
15. N. clipeata
16. N. danseri
17. N. densiflora
18. N. diatas
19. N. dubia
20. N. edwardsiana
21. N. ephippiata
22. N. eustachya
23. N. eymae
24. N. faizaliana
25. N. fusca
26. N. glabrata
27. N. gracilis
28. N. gracillima
29. N. gymnamphora
30. N. hamata
31. N. hirsuta
32. N. hispida
33. N. × hookeriana
34. N. inermis
35. N. insignis
36. N. × kinabaluensis
37. N. klossii
38. N. lamii
39. N. lavicola
40. N. lowii
41. N. macfarlanei
42. N. macrophylla
43. N. macrovulgaris
44. N. mapuluensis
45. N. maxima
46. N. merrilliana
47. N. mikei
48. N. mira
49. N. mirabilis
50. N. mollis
51. N. muluensis
52. N. murudensis
53. N. neoguineensis
54. N. northiana
55. N. ovata
56. N. paniculata
57. N. papuana
58. N. pectinata
59. N. petiolata
60. N. philippinensis
61. N. pilosa
62. N. rafflesiana
63. N. rajah
64. N. ramispina
65. N. reinwardtiana
66. N. rhombicaulis
67. N. sanguinea
68. N. sibuyanensis
69. N. singalana
70. N. spathulata
71. N. spectabilis
72. N. stenophylla
73. N. sumatrana
74. N. tentaculata
75. N. tobaica
76. N. tomoriana
77. N. treubiana
78. N. × trichocarpa
79. N. truncata
80. N. veitchii
81. N. ventricosa
82. N. villosa

Little known species

1. N. deaniana

Excluded species

1. N. cincta
2. N. cristata
3. N. lindleyana
4. N. neglecta

== Reviews ==
Taxonomist Jan Schlauer reviewed "Nepenthaceae" in the March 2002 issue of the Carnivorous Plant Newsletter. He wrote that the monograph "contains essentially the same information as the "skeletal revision" published in 1997". Schlauer also added:

Unfortunately, recent work on previously overlooked type specimens [...] and on Sumatran species [...] was not considered in the present account. Molecular identification and classification methods (removing all ambiguity) would have been more useful than the selection of epitypes to stabilize the names N. stenophylla and N. pilosa.

Laura S. Meitzner Yoder gave a positive appraisal of the monograph in the January 2005 issue of Economic Botany:

Species descriptions include comprehensive references and characteristics of vegetative and floral parts. As upper and lower pitchers are prominent and important for identification, the authors give ample information about these features. Notes for each species give expert tips on avoiding confusion with similar species, observations on existing collections, and unique ecological notes and anecdotes. These notes make readers feel privy to trail discussions on an expedition with those who know well and appreciate each species in the family.

Well illustrated, with 19 mostly full-page drawings, this volume is indispensable not only for the botanist and horticulturist, but also recommended for botanically inclined travellers who may encounter these curious plants in the wild.

"Nepenthaceae" was also reviewed by Charles Clarke in the September 2001 issue of the Bulletin of the Australian Carnivorous Plant Society.
