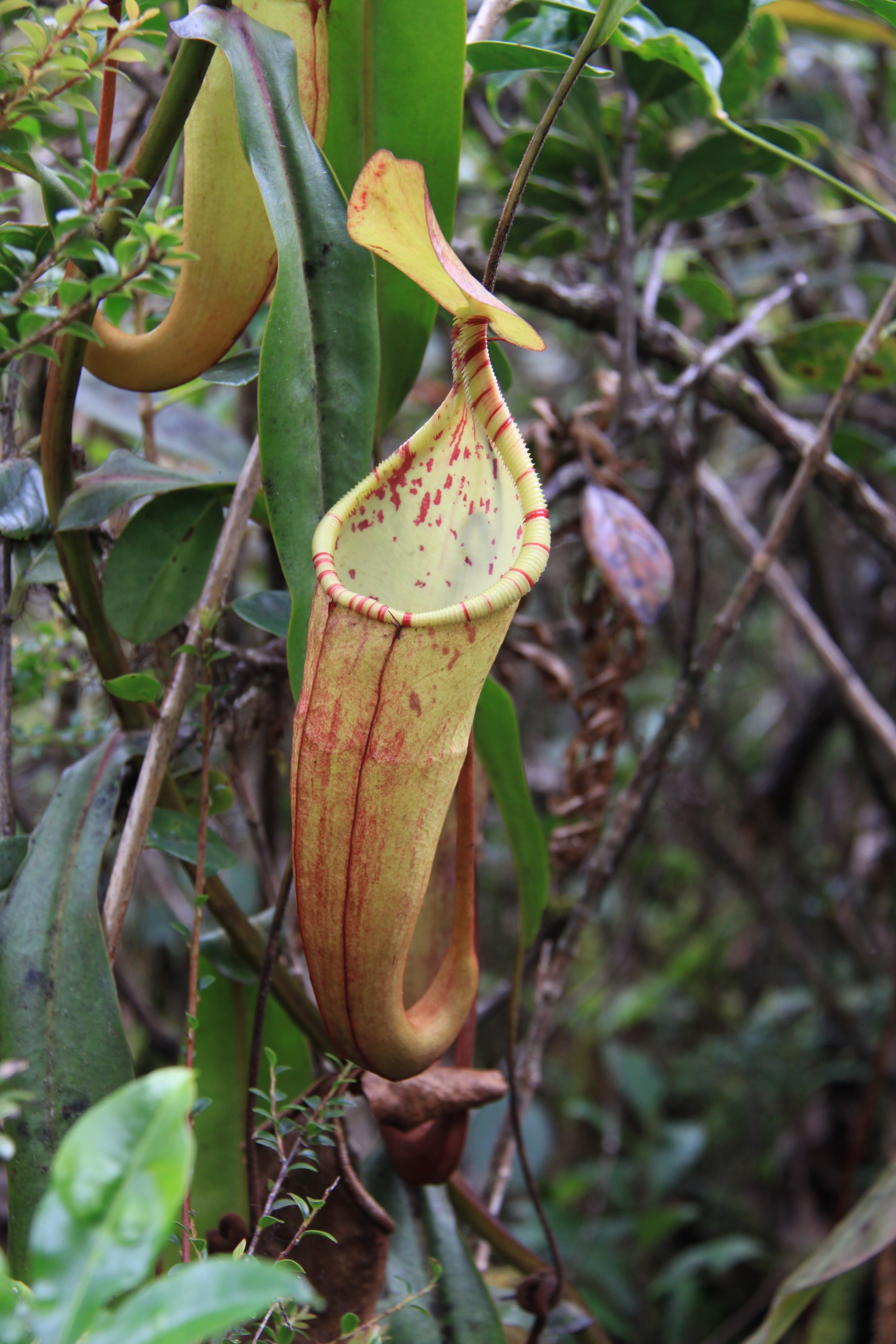
- An upper pitcher of N. densiflora from Mount Kemiri, Gunung Leuser National Park. This form of the species is unusual in producing partly cylindrical upper pitchers.

Conservation status
- Least Concern (IUCN 3.1)

Scientific classification
- Kingdom: Plantae
- Clade: Tracheophytes
- Clade: Angiosperms
- Clade: Eudicots
- Order: Caryophyllales
- Family: Nepenthaceae
- Genus: Nepenthes
- Species: N. densiflora

Binomial name
- Nepenthes densiflora Danser (1940)
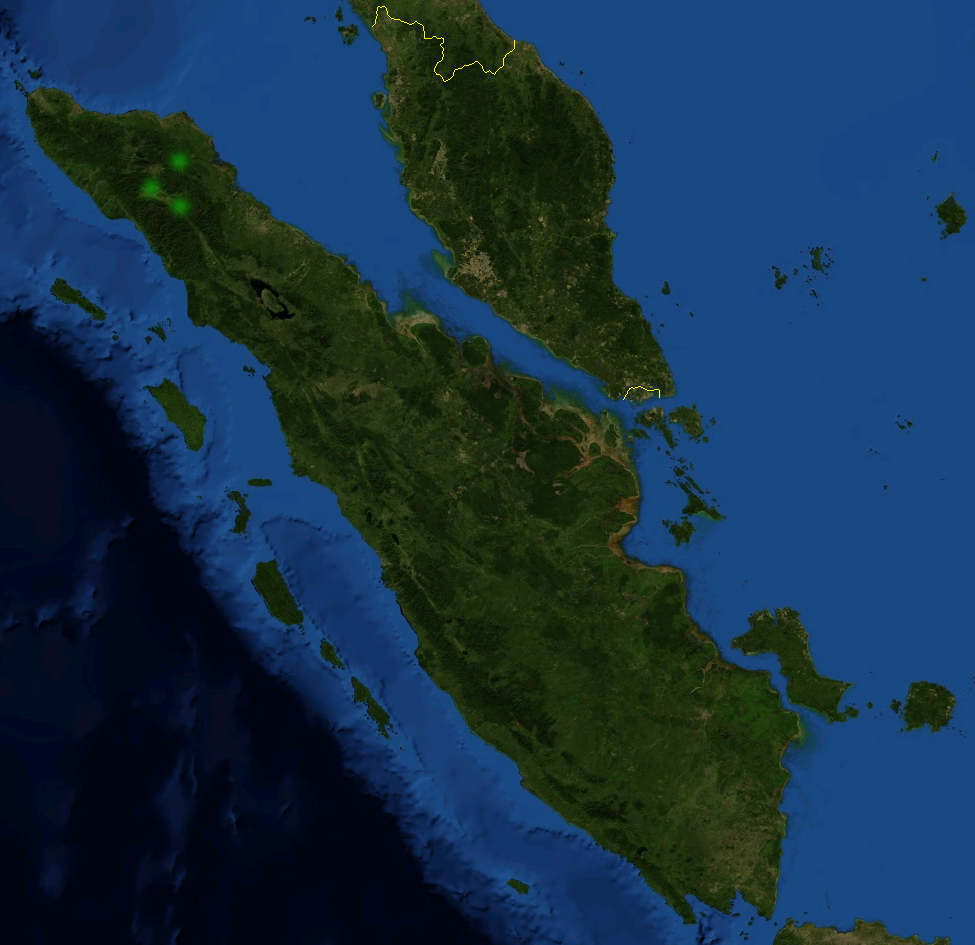
- Distribution of N. densiflora.

Synonyms
- Synonyms: Nepenthes bongso × Nepenthes pectinata Danser (1928); Nepenthes singalana auct. non Becc.: Tamin & M.Hotta in M.Hotta (1986) [=N. bongso/N. densiflora?/N. gymnamphora/ N. lavicola/N. singalana/N. spathulata]; Heterochresonyms: Nepenthes densiflora auct. non Danser: Jebb & Cheek (1997) [=N.densiflora/N. ovata]

= Nepenthes densiflora =

Species of pitcher plant from Sumatra

Nepenthes densiflora (/nɪˈpɛnθiːz ˌdɛnsɪˈflɔːrə/) is a tropical pitcher plant endemic to Sumatra, where it grows at an altitude of between 1,700 and 3,200 m above sea level.

No forms or varieties of N. densiflora have been described.

== Taxonomy ==
In 2001, Charles Clarke performed a cladistic analysis of the Nepenthes species of Sumatra and Peninsular Malaysia using 70 morphological characteristics of each taxon. The following is part of the resultant cladogram, showing "Clade 3", which comprises N. densiflora and three other related species.

- - - N. densiflora
    - unnamed
      - - N. diatas
      - unnamed
        - - N. singalana
          - N. spathulata

== Natural hybrids ==
The following natural hybrids involving N. densiflora have been recorded.

- N. angasanensis × N. densiflora
