= Nepenthes lavicola =

Conservation status
- Critically Endangered (IUCN 2.3)

Scientific classification
- Kingdom: Plantae
- Clade: Tracheophytes
- Clade: Angiosperms
- Clade: Eudicots
- Order: Caryophyllales
- Family: Nepenthaceae
- Genus: Nepenthes
- Species: N. lavicola

Binomial name
- Nepenthes lavicola Wistuba & Rischer (1996)

Synonyms
- Synonyms: Nepenthes singalana auct. non Becc.: Tamin & M.Hotta in M.Hotta (1986) [=N. bongso/N. densiflora?/N. gymnamphora/ N. lavicola/N. singalana/N. spathulata]; Nepenthes spectabilis auct. non Danser: Jebb & Cheek (1997) [=N. lavicola/N. spectabilis]

Species of pitcher plant from Sumatra

Nepenthes lavicola (/nɪˈpɛnθiːz ˌlævɪˈkoʊlə/; from Latin: lavicola growing upon lava) is a tropical pitcher plant species endemic to the Geureudong Massif of Aceh, northern Sumatra, where it grows at 2,000–2,600 m above sea level. It is thought to be most closely related to N. singalana and N. spectabilis.

Nepenthes lavicola is notable for its very prominent bracts, which often overarch the flowers and may be up to 7 cm long at the base of female inflorescences. This species is also unusual in that it bears up to two bracts per pedicel or partial peduncle.

Swiss botanist Albert Friedrich Frey-Wyssling mentioned N. lavicola in a 1931 article as an unidentified Nepenthes species.

Differences between N. lavicola, N. singalana and N. spectabilis (Wistuba & Rischer, 1996)
Character	N. lavicola	N. singalana	N. spectabilis
Shape of lower pitchers	urceolate to globose	basal part infundibuliform, cylindrical in the upper part	ovate in the lower part, cylindrical in the upper part
Shape of upper pitchers	slender, lower part infundibuliform to ovate then ventricose, slightly hipped in the middle narrowing to the somewhat waisted cylindrical upper part	lower half infundibuliform, mostly ventricose in the middle, cylindrical or slightly narrowed towards the mouth	infundibuliform in the lower half, tubulose in the upper half
Colour of pitchers	usually dark brownish purple to almost black, peristome yellowish green, sometimes with red stripes, occasionally colour of pitchers yellowish green with blackish spots, innerside of the pitchers pale green, in the lower pitchers red spotted	light green to dark red, violett spotted or not	light green, with numerous longitudinal dark violett - brown stripes and spots
Lid	ovate-cordate	suborbicular, cordate at the base	orbiculate
Spur	up to 0.5 cm in length, branched in case of lower pitchers	2-3 mm, slightly flattened, not branched	2 cm in length, simple
Spur insertion	close to the lid base	close to the lid	5-10 mm below the lid base
Floral bracts	bracts very prominent, usually overarching the flowers, some of the lower ones reaching several cm in length	male: filiform bract, female: without bract	pedicels bearing filiform bracts
Fruit	2-3 times as long as broad, up to 1.8 cm long	up to 30 mm long	very slender, 4-5 cm in length

Nepenthes lavicola has no known natural hybrids. No forms or varieties have been described.
