= Mount Pangulubao =

Mountain in Sumatra, Indonesia

- Gunung Pangulubao
- Location within Indonesia

Highest point
- Elevation: 2,215 m (7,267 ft)
- Prominence: 1,031 m (3,383 ft)
- Listing: List of volcanoes in Indonesia; Ribu
- Coordinates: 2°35′52″N 99°03′55″E

Geography
- Location: Sumatra, Indonesia

Mount Pangulubao or Pangulubau (Indonesian: Gunung Pangulubao) is a mountain near Lake Toba in Sumatra.

Mount Pangulubao is notable for its large number of native tropical pitcher plant species. These include Nepenthes ampullaria, Nepenthes gymnamphora, Nepenthes mikei, Nepenthes ovata, Nepenthes rhombicaulis, Nepenthes spectabilis, and Nepenthes tobaica. The natural hybrid Nepenthes × pangulubauensis is named after it.

== See also ==
- Geography of Indonesia
