= Nepenthes angasanensis =

- Nepenthes angasanensis holotype (Salmon & Maulder 234372).

Conservation status
- Least Concern (IUCN 3.1)

Scientific classification
- Kingdom: Plantae
- Clade: Tracheophytes
- Clade: Angiosperms
- Clade: Eudicots
- Order: Caryophyllales
- Family: Nepenthaceae
- Genus: Nepenthes
- Species: N. angasanensis

Binomial name
- Nepenthes angasanensis Maulder, D.Schub., B.R.Salmon & B.Quinn (1999)
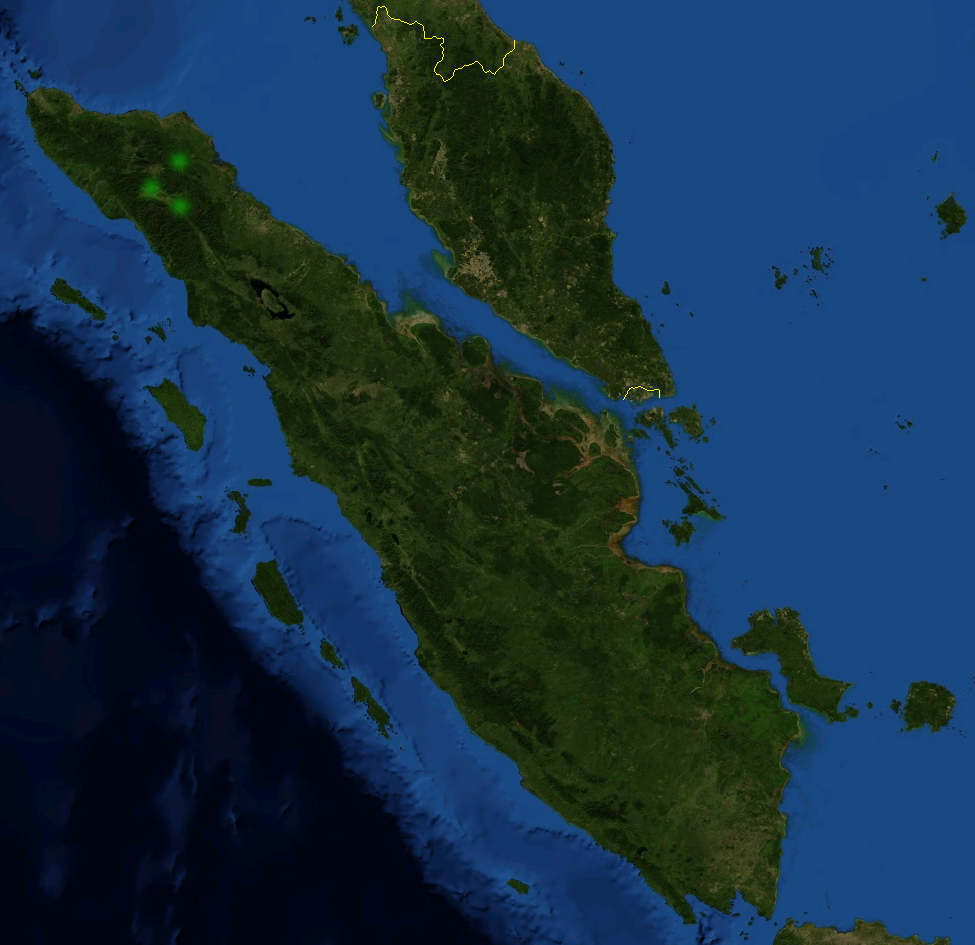
- Distribution of N. angasanensis.

Synonyms
- Synonyms: Nepenthes mikei auct. non B.R.Salmon & Maulder: Jebb & Cheek (1997); Cheek & Jebb (2001) [=N. angasanensis/N. mikei]; Nepenthes tobaica auct. non Danser (1928): Danser (1940); Nepenthes tobaica auct. non Danser: Tamin & M.Hotta in M.Hotta (1986) [=N. angasanensis/N. tobaica]

Species of pitcher plant from Sumatra

Nepenthes angasanensis /nɪˈpɛnθiːz ˌæŋɡəsəˈnɛnsɪs/ is a tropical pitcher plant species endemic to Sumatra, where it grows at an altitude of 1,400 metres (4,600 ft) to 3,100 metres (10,200 ft) above sea level. The status of this taxon is controversial as it is similar in morphology to N. mikei and N. tobaica. It has even been suggested that the taxon might represent a natural hybrid between N. densiflora and N. tobaica.

The specific epithet refers to Mount Puncak Angasan, from which the type specimen was collected. No forms or varieties of N. angasanensis have been described.

== Taxonomy ==
Differences between N. angasanensis, N. mikei and N. tobaica (Salmon & Maulder, 1999)
Character	N. angasanensis	N. mikei	N. tobaica
Habit	Produces offshoots from underground rhizomes	No rhizomes	No rhizomes
Spur	Forked	Fasciculate	Filiform
Inner margin of peristome	Teeth to 1.5 millimetres (0.06 in) to 2 millimetres (0.08 in) long	Teeth to 0.2 millimetres (0.01 in) to 0.4 millimetres (0.02 in) long	Teeth < 0.2 millimetres (0.01 in)
Stem cross section	Cylindrical	Cylindrical	Cylindrical to obtusely triangular
Bracteoles	Sometimes near base of lowest pedicel only	Half way up every pedicel	At base or slightly below pedicel attachment, few
Pitcher glands	300 / cm^{2} (1900 per sq in)	150–180 / cm^{2} (1000 to 1200 per sq in)	200–250 / cm^{2} (1300 to 1600 per sq in)
Pedicels	1-flowered	1-flowered	2-flowered
Inflorescence (female)	5.5 centimetres (2 in) to 12.5 centimetres (5 in) long, 9–17 flowers	4 centimetres (2 in) to 8 centimetres (3 in) long, 4–10 flowers	19.5 centimetres (8 in) to 40 centimetres (16 in) long, 30–50 flowers

In 2001, Charles Clarke performed a cladistic analysis of the Nepenthes species of Sumatra and Peninsular Malaysia using 70 morphological characteristics of each taxon. The following is a portion of the resultant cladogram, showing part of "Clade 6". The sister pair of N. angasanensis and N. mikei has 79% support.

- - unnamed
    - N. gracilis
    - N. reinwardtiana
  - unnamed
    - - N. tobaica
      - 79%
        - N. angasanensis
        - N. mikei

== Natural hybrids ==
The following natural hybrids involving N. angasanensis have been recorded.

- N. angasanensis × N. densiflora
