= Nepenthes melamphora (disambiguation) =

Nepenthes melamphora may refer to:

- Nepenthes melamphora Reinw. ex Blume (1852) — synonym of N. gymnamphora
- Nepenthes melamphora auct. non Reinw. ex Blume: Hook.f. (1859) — pro parte synonym of N. gymnamphora and N. khasiana
- Nepenthes melamphora auct. non Reinw. ex Blume: Fern.-Vill. (1880) — synonym of N. alata
- Nepenthes melamphora var. haematamphora (Miq.) Miq. (1858) — synonym of N. gymnamphora
- Nepenthes melamphora var. lucida Blume (1852) — synonym of N. gymnamphora
- Nepenthes melamphora var. tomentella Becc. (1886) — synonym of N. gymnamphora
