= Nepenthes × pangulubauensis =

Scientific classification
- Kingdom: Plantae
- Clade: Tracheophytes
- Clade: Angiosperms
- Clade: Eudicots
- Order: Caryophyllales
- Family: Nepenthaceae
- Genus: Nepenthes
- Species: N. × pangulubauensis

Binomial name
- Nepenthes × pangulubauensis Hort.B.R.Salmon & Maulder ex P.Mann in sched. (1996) nom.nud.

Species of carnivorous plant

Nepenthes × pangulubauensis (/nɪˈpɛnθiːz pæŋˌɡuːluːbaʊˈɛnsɪs/; from Mount Pangulubau) is a natural hybrid between N. mikei and N. gymnamphora (or N. xiphioides, depending on whether it is considered a distinct species). It is endemic to the Indonesian island of Sumatra.
