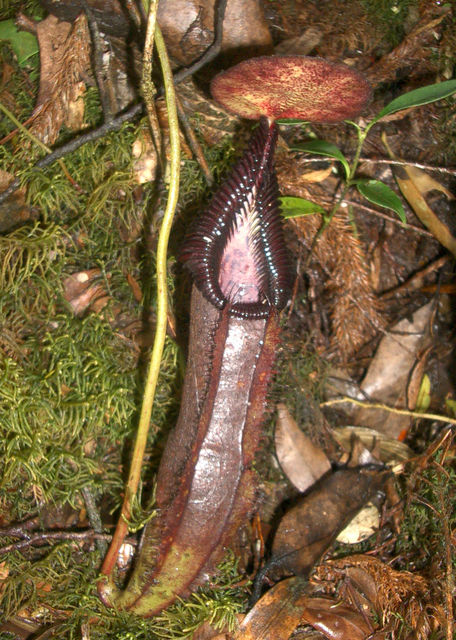
- Lower pitcher of Nepenthes singalana from Mount Belirang.

Conservation status
- Least Concern (IUCN 3.1)

Scientific classification
- Kingdom: Plantae
- Clade: Embryophytes
- Clade: Tracheophytes
- Clade: Spermatophytes
- Clade: Angiosperms
- Clade: Eudicots
- Order: Caryophyllales
- Family: Nepenthaceae
- Genus: Nepenthes
- Species: N. singalana

Binomial name
- Nepenthes singalana Becc. (1886)

Synonyms
- Synonyms: Nepenthes junghuhnii Macfarl. ex Ridl. (1917); Nepenthes pectinata Danser (1928) [=N. gymnamphora/N. singalana]; N. pectinata × N. singalana Danser (1928); Heterochresonyms: Nepenthes singalana auct. non Becc.: Macfarl. (1908) [=N. alba/N. singalana]; Nepenthes singalana auct. non Becc.: Macfarl. (1914) [=N. alba]; Nepenthes singalana auct. non Becc.: Tamin & M.Hotta in M.Hotta (1986) [=N. bongso/N. densiflora?/N. gymnamphora/N. lavicola/N. singalana/N. spathulata]

= Nepenthes singalana =

Species of pitcher plant from Sumatra

Nepenthes singalana (/nɪˈpɛnθiːz ˌsɪŋɡəˈlɑːnə/; after Mount Singgalang, West Sumatra) is a tropical pitcher plant endemic to the island of Sumatra, where it grows at 2,000–2,900 m above sea level. It is most closely allied to N. diatas and N. spathulata.

== Taxonomy ==
In 2001, Charles Clarke performed a cladistic analysis of the Nepenthes species of Sumatra and Peninsular Malaysia using 70 morphological characteristics of each taxon. The following is part of the resultant cladogram, showing "Clade 3", which comprises N. singalana and three other related species.

- - - N. densiflora
    - unnamed
      - - N. diatas
      - unnamed
        - - N. singalana
          - N. spathulata

== Natural hybrids ==
The following natural hybrids involving N. singalana have been recorded.

- N. aristolochioides × N. singalana
- N. bongso × N. singalana
- N. gymnamphora × N. singalana
- N. inermis × N. singalana
- ? N. singalana × N. spathulata
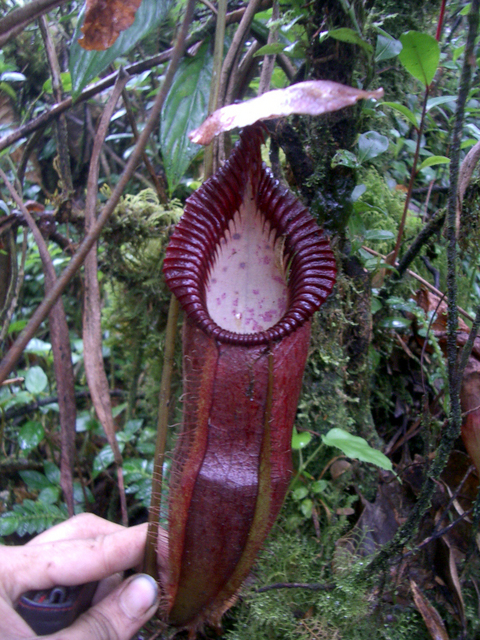
? N. singalana × N. spathulata
