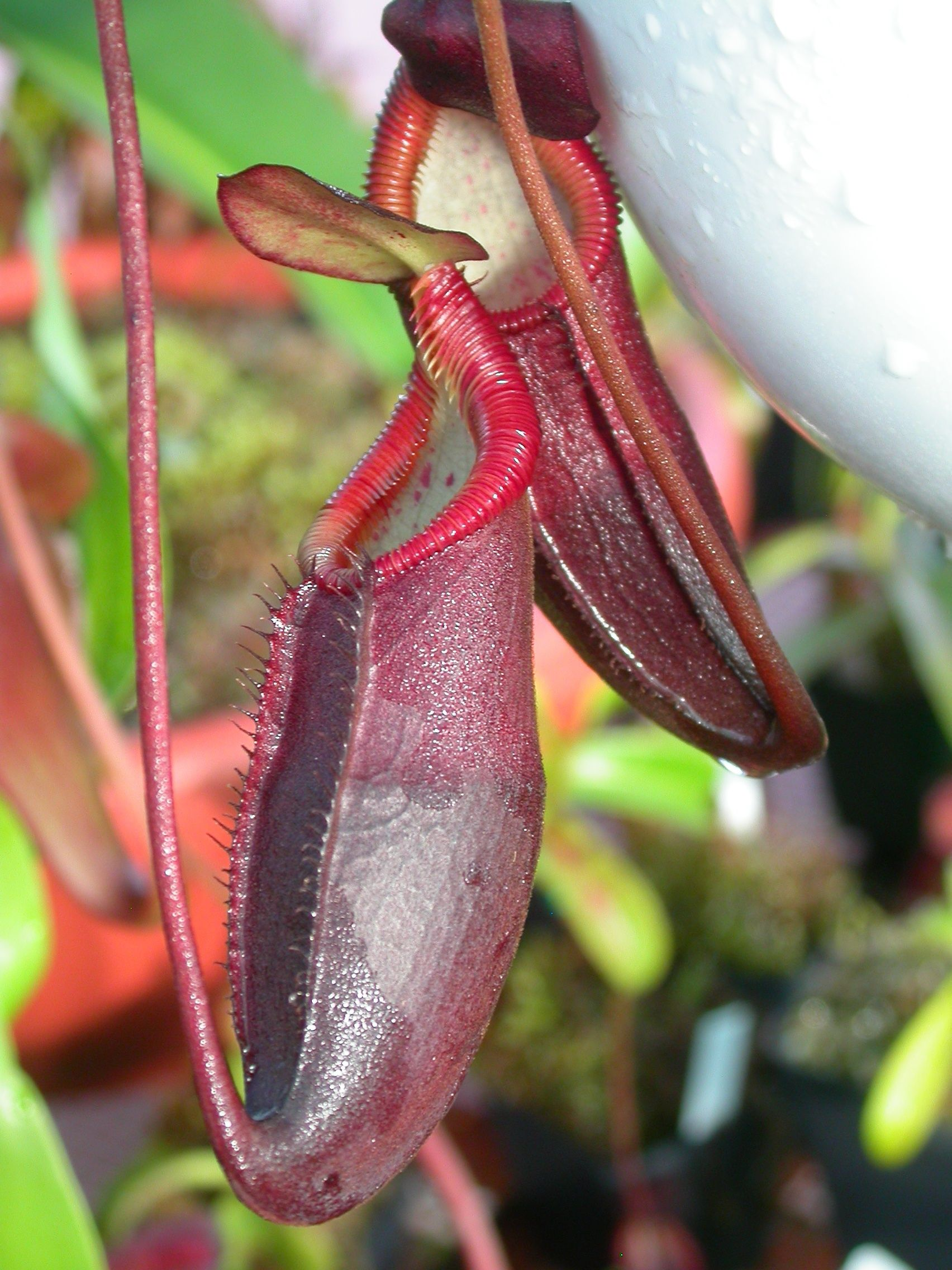
- Lower pitcher of Nepenthes diatas. Cultivated plant.

Conservation status
- Least Concern (IUCN 3.1)

Scientific classification
- Kingdom: Plantae
- Clade: Tracheophytes
- Clade: Angiosperms
- Clade: Eudicots
- Order: Caryophyllales
- Family: Nepenthaceae
- Genus: Nepenthes
- Species: N. diatas

Binomial name
- Nepenthes diatas Jebb & Cheek (1997)
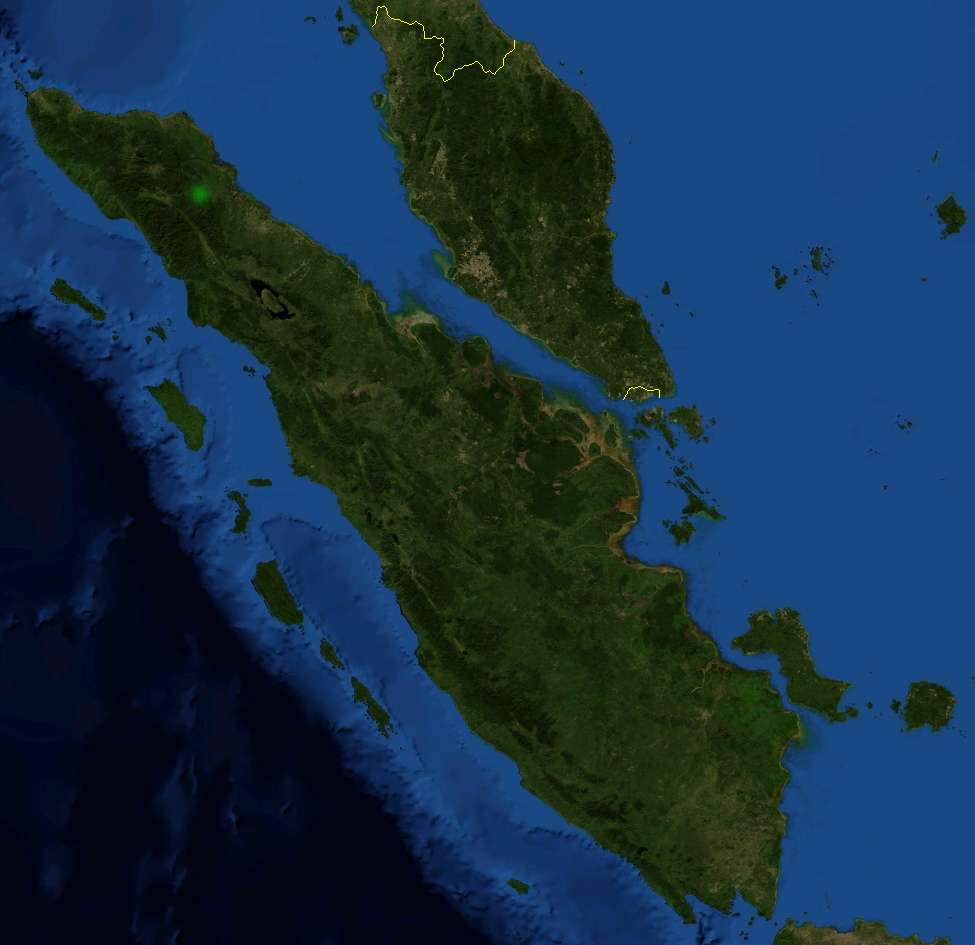
- Distribution of N. diatas.

= Nepenthes diatas =

Species of pitcher plant from Indonesia

Nepenthes diatas (/nɪˈpɛnθiːz daɪˈætəs/ nih-PEN-theez dy-AT-əs; from Indonesian di atas "above, on top") is a tropical pitcher plant endemic to Sumatra, where it grows at an altitude of 2,000–2,900 metres (6,600–9,500 ft) above sea level. No forms or varieties of N. diatas have been described.

== Taxonomy ==
Nepenthes diatas was formally described in 1997 by Matthew Jebb and Martin Cheek in their monograph "A skeletal revision of Nepenthes (Nepenthaceae)", published in the botanical journal Blumea. However, the name N. diatas had already been in use since at least 1994. The epithet derives from Indonesian di atas ("above"), referring from its endemic status to the northern part of Sumatra, and also its montane distribution.

In 2001, Charles Clarke performed a cladistic analysis of the Nepenthes species of Sumatra and Peninsular Malaysia using 70 morphological characteristics of each taxon. The following is part of the resultant cladogram, showing "Clade 3", which comprises N. diatas and three other related species.

- - - N. densiflora
    - unnamed
      - - N. diatas
      - unnamed
        - - N. singalana
          - N. spathulata

== Description ==
N. diatas is a terrestrial subscandent shrub that grows up to 2.5 metres (8.2 ft) tall. Its leaves are thinly coriaceous and sessile, measuring about 9.5–17 centimetres (3.7–6.7 in) long 2.5–3.5 centimetres (0.98–1.38 in) wide, while the leaves of its climbing stems are oblanceolate. Its fruit valves are in dimensions of 27–32 by 3–4 mm, but the seeds are not discovered in Jebb and Cheek's original description.

In general, it was described by Jebb and Cheek as the "far more robust version" of N. singalana, with the key difference is N. diatas have a woody peristome, while the N. singalana equivalent has a papery texture, along with N. spathulata.

== Distribution ==
N. diatas is endemic to Aceh in northern Sumatra, specifically at the summit area of Gunung Bandahara, where it grows in montane scrub and mossy forest in elevations of 2,400–2,600 metres (7,900–8,500 ft).

== Natural hybrids ==
The following natural hybrids involving N. diatas have been recorded.

- N. diatas × N. mikei
