= Mount Bandahara =

Mountain in Indonesia

- Location within Sumatra

Highest point
- Elevation: 3,030 m (9,940 ft)
- Listing: Ribu
- Coordinates: 3°44′56″N 97°46′53″E

Geography
- Location: Gayo Lues, Aceh, Indonesia
- Parent range: Bukit Barisan

Geology
- Volcanic arc: Sunda Arc

Bandahara or Mount Bandahara (Indonesian: Gunung Bandahara) is one of the mountain peaks located in Aceh Province, precisely in the Gayo Lues Regency area, with a height of about 3,030 meters above sea level. This mountain is part of the Barisan Mountains which have an important role in the hydrological system and biodiversity in the region.

== Geography ==
Mount Bandahara is part of the Mount Leuser National Park, which is known as a protected area with a rich tropical forest ecosystem. This mountain plays an important role in maintaining the balance of nature and providing vital water resources for the surrounding area.

== Ecology ==
Mount Bandahara is a habitat for various protected flora and fauna species, including several rare and endangered species. One of the species found in this area is the Sumatran tiger (Panthera tigris sumatrae), which is classified as a critically endangered species. This biodiversity also includes various types of endemic plants such as Nepenthes diatas that can only be found in this mountain area.

== Conservation ==
As part of the Mount Leuser National Park area, Mount Bandahara also plays a role in conservation and nature protection efforts. The existence of this mountain is important in maintaining the sustainability of the ecosystem, not only at the local level, but also for the sustainability of the wider environment on the island of Sumatra.

Given the natural and ecological potential it has, it is important for the government and the community to continue to maintain and preserve the existence of Mount Bandahara. This includes efforts to protect the natural habitat and wise management of the area to ensure the sustainability of its ecosystem in the long term.

== See also ==
- List of ultras of the Malay Archipelago
