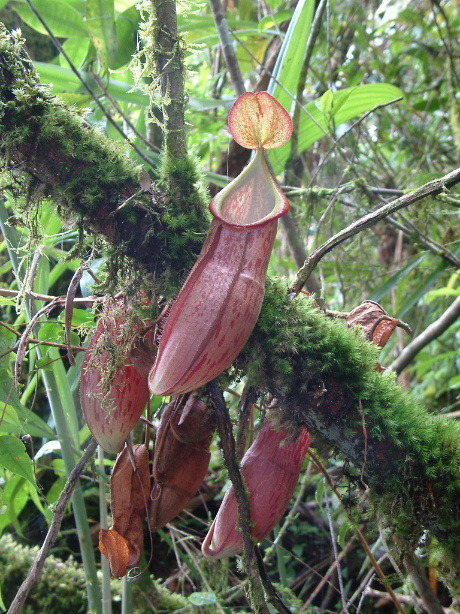
- Intermediate pitchers of N. gymnamphora from Sumatra

Conservation status
- Least Concern (IUCN 2.3)

Scientific classification
- Kingdom: Plantae
- Clade: Tracheophytes
- Clade: Angiosperms
- Clade: Eudicots
- Order: Caryophyllales
- Family: Nepenthaceae
- Genus: Nepenthes
- Species: N. gymnamphora

Binomial name
- Nepenthes gymnamphora Reinw. ex Nees (1824)

Synonyms
- Synonyms: ?Nepenthes glabra Lindl. ex Rafarin (1869); Nepenthes melamphora Reinw. ex Blume (1852) nom.illeg.; Nepenthes melamphora auct. non Reinw. ex Blume: Hook.f. (1859) [=N. gymnamphora/N. khasiana]; Nepenthes melamphora var. haematamphora (Miq.) Miq. (1858); Nepenthes melamphora var. lucida Blume (1852); Nepenthes melamphora var. tomentella Becc. (1886); Nepenthes pectinata Danser (1928) [=N. gymnamphora/N. singalana]; Nepenthes phyllamphora auct. non Willd.: Reinw. ex Miq. (1858); Nepenthes rafflesiana auct. non Jack: Haberl. (1893); Nepenthes rancing Hort. ex B.R.Salmon & Maulder (1995) nom.illeg.; Nepenthes rhombicaulis auct. non Sh.Kurata: K.Kondo & M.Kondo (1983); Nepenthes rosulata Tamin & M.Hotta in M.Hotta (1986) nom.nud.; Nepenthes singalana auct. non Becc.: Tamin & M.Hotta in M.Hotta (1986) [=N. bongso/N. densiflora?/N. gymnamphora/ N. lavicola/N. singalana/N. spathulata]; Nepenthes spinosa Tamin & M.Hotta in M.Hotta (1986) nom.nud. [=N. gymnamphora/N. sumatrana]; Nepenthes xiphioides B.R.Salmon & Maulder (1995)

= Nepenthes gymnamphora =

Species of pitcher plant from Indonesia

Nepenthes gymnamphora /nɪˈpɛnθiːz dʒɪmˈnæmfɔːrə/ is a tropical pitcher plant native to the Indonesian islands of Java and Sumatra. It has a wide altitudinal range of 600–2,800 metres (2,000–9,200 ft) above sea level. There is much debate surrounding the taxonomic status of this species and the taxa N. pectinata and N. xiphioides.

The specific epithet gymnamphora is derived from the Greek words gymnos (naked) and amphoreus (pitcher).

== Taxonomy ==
An illustration of the type specimen of N. pectinata from Danser's monograph

The N. gymnamphora group of related taxa has been variously interpreted as comprising a single extremely variable species (N. gymnamphora); two distinct species, one from Java (N. gymnamphora) and one from Sumatra (N. pectinata); or two species, one with a wide distribution covering Java and Sumatra (N. gymnamphora) and one with a very restricted range in Sumatra (N. xiphioides). An additional fourth undescribed taxon, known from Mount Sorik Merapi in Sumatra, may also fall within N. gymnamphora.

=== Nepenthes pectinata ===
Nepenthes pectinata^{[a]} was described by B. H. Danser in his seminal 1928 monograph "The Nepenthaceae of the Netherlands Indies". Danser's description of N. pectinata was based on material that included upper pitchers of N. singalana. This was first noted in 1994 by Jan Schlauer and Joachim Nerz, who provided a lectotype for N. pectinata: Bünnemeijer 700, a specimen collected on Mount Talakmau.

Danser mentioned another specimen in his monograph that he identified as the natural hybrid N. pectinata × N. singalana, but which actually represented a pure N. singalana.

Nepenthes pectinata has a separate conservation status of Least Concern on the IUCN Red List.

=== Nepenthes xiphioides ===
Nepenthes xiphioides^{[b]} was described by Bruce Salmon and Ricky Maulder in a 1995 issue of the Carnivorous Plant Newsletter. The authors treated N. pectinata as conspecific with N. gymnamphora, and distinguished N. xiphioides from the latter based on a number of characters shown in the table below.

Morphological differences between N. gymnamphora and N. xiphioides according to Salmon & Maulder (1995)
Morphological character	N. gymnamphora	N. xiphioides
Longitudinal leaf veins	3-6 running in outer 2/3- 4/5 of blade	2-3 running in outer 1/2 of blade
Leaf margins	covered with short dense hair	glabrous
Rosette leaf tendril	about as long as the pitcher	2-3 times as long as the leaf
Rosette pitchers	8–12 centimetres (3–5 in) tall, 3–4 centimetres (1–2 in) broad	4–5.5 centimetres (1.6–2.2 in) tall, 1.5–2 centimetres (0.6–0.8 in) broad
Aerial pitchers	present	absent
Peristome teeth	3-6 times as long as broad	6-8 times as long as broad
Inflorescence	mostly 2 flowered, upper most ones 1 flowered; rarely most or all of them 1 flowered	1 flowered but bearing some 2 flowered pedicels in lower 1/3
Staminal column	hairy at base or over whole length	glabrous

== Infraspecific taxa ==
- Nepenthes gymnamphora var. haematamphora Miq. (1851)
- Nepenthes gymnamphora var. pectinata (Danser) Hort.Westphal (1999) in sched.

== Natural hybrids ==
- N. bongso × N. gymnamphora
- N. gymnamphora × N. mikei [=N. × pangulubauensis]
- N. gymnamphora × N. ovata
- N. gymnamphora × N. reinwardtiana
- ? N. gymnamphora × N. rhombicaulis
- N. gymnamphora × N. singalana
- N. gymnamphora × N. spathulata
- N. gymnamphora × N. spectabilis
- N. gymnamphora × N. talangensis
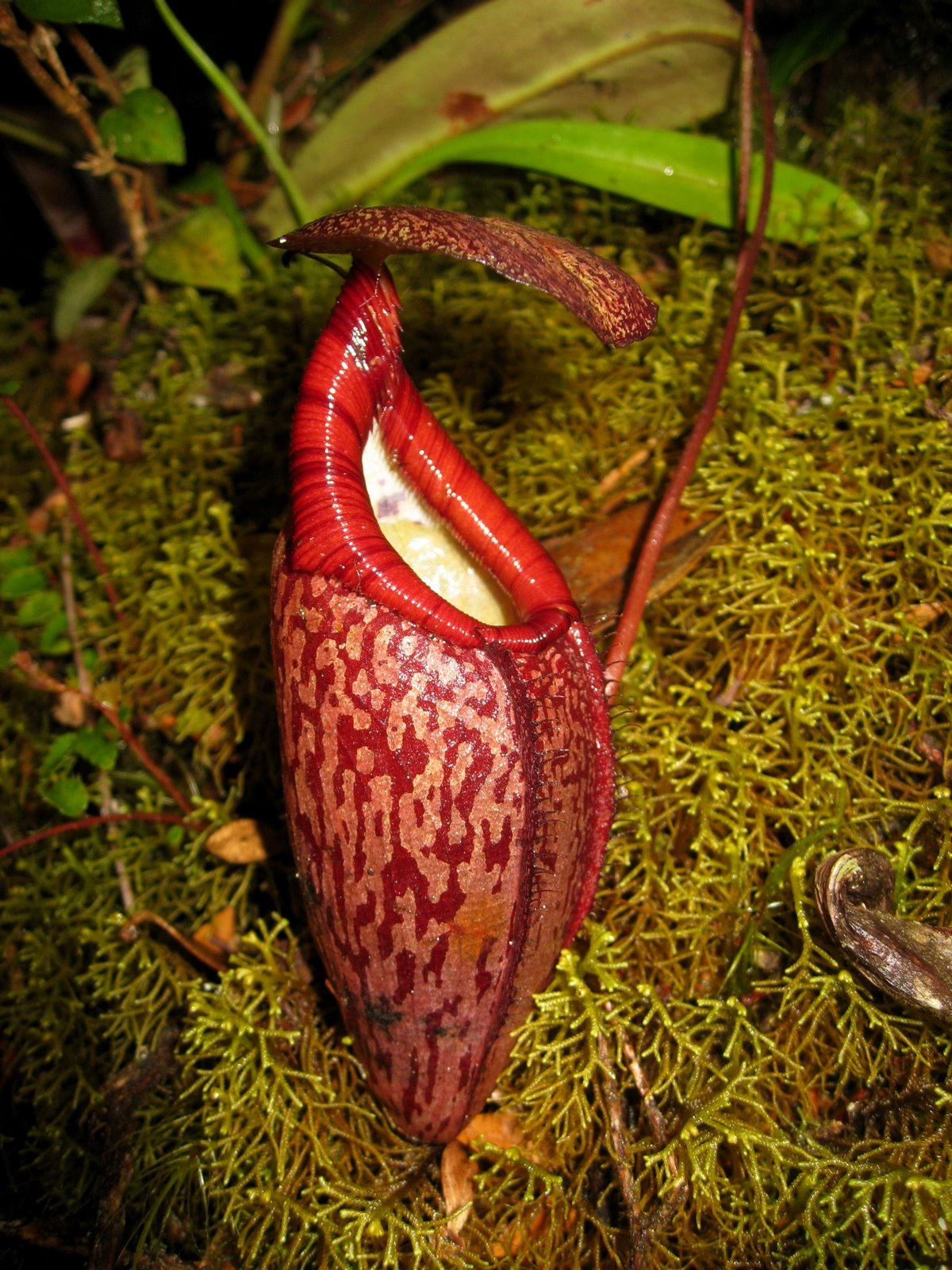
? N. gymnamphora × N. spectabilis

== Notes ==
a. Nepenthes pectinata is pronounced /nɪˈpɛnθiːz ˌpɛktɪˈnɑːtə/. The specific epithet is derived from the Latin word pectinata, meaning "comb-shaped".
b. Nepenthes xiphioides is pronounced /nɪˈpɛnθiːz zɪfiːˈɔɪdiːz/. The specific epithet is derived from the Neo-Latin word xiphius (sword) and the Latin ending -oides (resembling), and refers to the long, thin teeth lining the inner margin of the peristome of this species.
