= Matthew Jebb =

Irish botanist

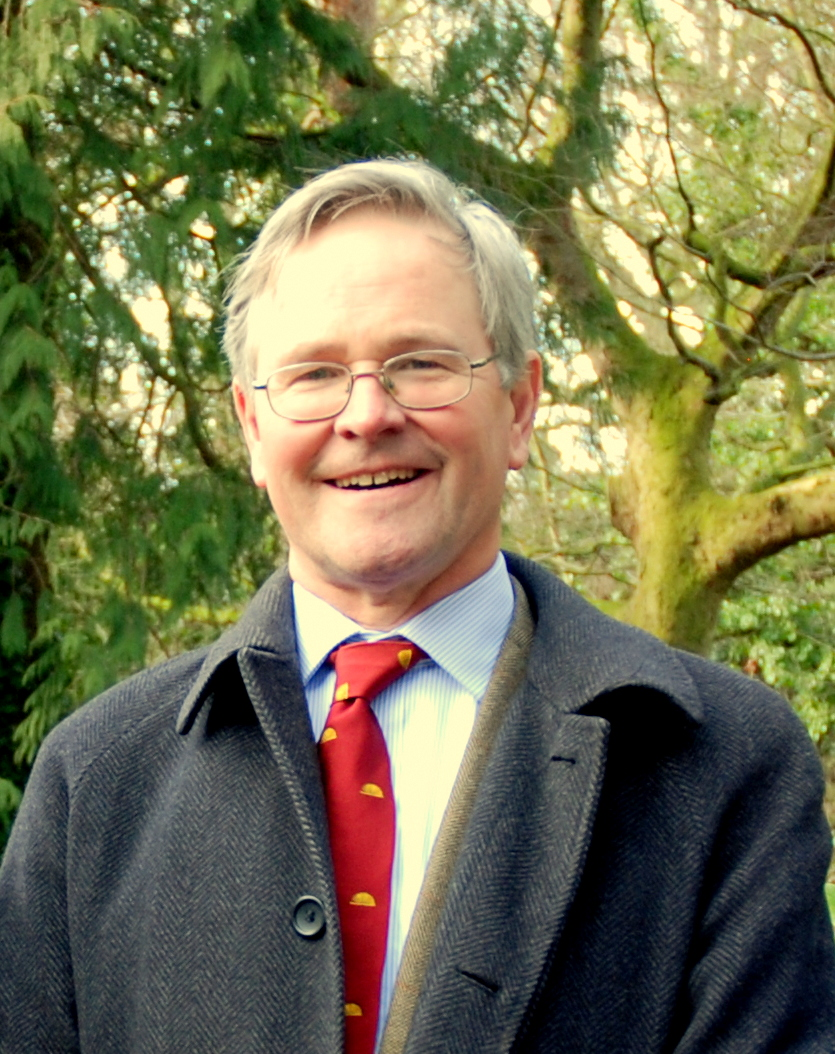
- Dr Matthew Jebb, Director of the National Botanic Gardens of Ireland
- Born: Matthew Hilary Peter Jebb; 1958 (age 67–68); Kilkenny

Matthew Hilary Peter Jebb (born 1958) is an Irish botanist and taxonomist specialising in the ant plant genera Squamellaria, Myrmecodia, Hydnophytum, Myrmephytum and Anthorrhiza, as well as the carnivorous plant genus Nepenthes.

Jebb has described several new Nepenthes species, all with Martin Cheek, including: N. argentii, N. aristolochioides, N. danseri, N. diatas, N. lamii, N. mira, and N. murudensis. Jebb and Cheek also raised N. macrophylla to species rank. Jebb and Cheek revised the genus in two major monographs: "A skeletal revision of Nepenthes (Nepenthaceae)" (1997) and "Nepenthaceae" (2001). Jebb also authored the 1991 monograph "An account of Nepenthes in New Guinea".

Jebb undertook his primary degree and D.Phil. at Oxford University. His Ph.D. looked at the taxonomy and tuber morphology of the rubiaceous ant-plants. Following a 5-year appointment as Director of the Christensen Research Institute at Madang, Papua New Guinea, Matthew took up a 2-year post-doc position at Trinity College Dublin. This work worked involved preparation of a revision of the Araliaceae for the Flora of Thailand project. Matthew has revised the family Nepenthaceae for Flora Malesiana.

Jebb was the Director of the National Botanic Gardens based in Glasnevin. He retired in early 2026. Jebb is the son of the architect and Liberal Party politician Philip Jebb, and great-grandson of the writer Hilaire Belloc.
