= Mitsuru Hotta =

Japanese botanist

Mitsuru Hotta (堀田 満, Hotta Mitsuru) (23 July 1935 – 8 July 2015) was a Japanese botanist best known for his research on Araceae.

Hotta was born in Osaka, Japan in 1935. He graduated from the Agricultural Department of Osaka Prefecture University in 1960. The same year, he took part in the Tonga and Fiji Expedition organised by Kyoto University. Between 1963 and 1964, Hotta made numerous plant collections in Borneo together with Professor Minoru Hirano of Osaka City University.
