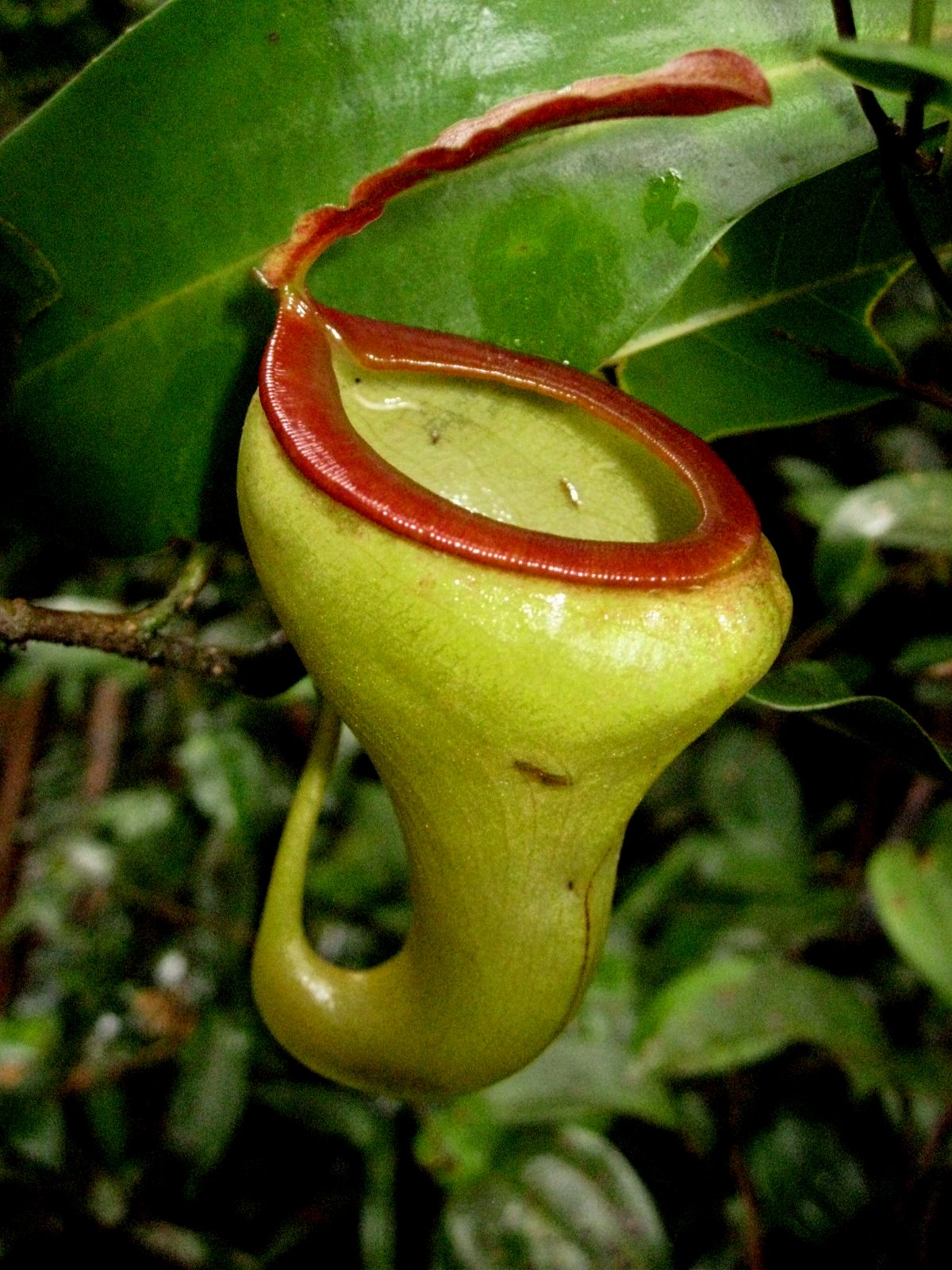
- An upper pitcher of Nepenthes × pyriformis

Conservation status
- Endangered (IUCN 3.1)

Scientific classification
- Kingdom: Plantae
- Clade: Tracheophytes
- Clade: Angiosperms
- Clade: Eudicots
- Order: Caryophyllales
- Family: Nepenthaceae
- Genus: Nepenthes
- Species: N. × pyriformis

Binomial name
- Nepenthes × pyriformis Sh.Kurata (2001)

Synonyms
- Synonyms: Nepenthes dubia auct. non Danser: Jebb & Cheek (1997) [=N. dubia/N. tenuis/N. × pyriformis]; Nepenthes dubia auct. non Danser: Sh.Kurata (1973); N. bongso × N. inermis Hopkins, Maulder & B.R.Salmon (1990)

= Nepenthes × pyriformis =

Species of carnivorous plant

Nepenthes × pyriformis (/nɪˈpɛnθiːz ˌpɪrɪˈfɔːrmɪs, - ˌpaɪər-/; from Latin for "pear-shaped") is a natural hybrid involving N. inermis and N. talangensis. It is known only from Mount Talang in Sumatra, to which N. talangensis is endemic. Nepenthes talangensis was only described as a distinct species in 1994. Prior to this it was placed within N. bongso and some of the older literature identifies this hybrid as N. bongso × N. inermis.

Nepenthes inermis × N. talangensis has been the subject of taxonomic confusion in the past. In an article published in 1973 on the Nepenthes of Borneo, Singapore, and Sumatra, botanist Shigeo Kurata incorrectly identified specimens of this hybrid as belonging to N. dubia.

In 1997, Matthew Jebb and Martin Cheek published their monograph "A skeletal revision of Nepenthes (Nepenthaceae)", in which they referred to N. dubia plant material from Mount Talang (Kurata s.n. SING). Charles Clarke later identified Kurata s.n. as representing N. inermis × N. talangensis.

The natural hybrid is similar to N. dubia, but can be distinguished on the basis of several stable characters. The hybrid has a wider pitcher lid that is never relfexed beyond 90 degrees and the pitcher cup is not appressed in the lower parts as in N. dubia. In addition, the mouth of N. inermis × N. talangensis is raised towards the back as opposed to being horizontal.

In 2001, Kurata described this hybrid as a new species, N. pyriformis. Clarke rejected this interpretation in his monograph Nepenthes of Sumatra and Peninsular Malaysia, published the same year. Clarke found that the type specimen of N. pyriformis, Kurata & Mikil 4230 NDC, matches the appearance of N. inermis × N. talangensis "in most respects". Following Clarke's interpretation, Kurata excluded N. pyriformis from his list of Nepenthes species the following year.
