= Nepenthes of Sumatra and Peninsular Malaysia =

- Cover showing N. sumatrana
- Author: Charles Clarke
- Language: English
- Publisher: Natural History Publications (Borneo)
- Publication date: August 28, 2001
- Media type: Print (hardcover)
- Pages: x + 326
- ISBN: 983-812-050-2
- OCLC: 48481057

Nepenthes of Sumatra and Peninsular Malaysia is a monograph by Charles Clarke on the tropical pitcher plants of Sumatra, Peninsular Malaysia, and their minor surrounding islands. It was published in 2001 by Natural History Publications (Borneo). Clarke described it as "intermediate between an ecological monograph and a taxonomic one".

== Background ==
The work was conceived in late 1997 and represents the culmination of 3 years of intensive research that included 15 field trips and numerous herbarium visits. The project encountered a number of difficulties and setbacks, including a "severe drought" in 1997 and political unrest in the following two years. Of the species covered in the book, Clarke observed all but three in the field. Nepenthes lavicola could not be reached due to the prevailing political situation in parts of Aceh, whereas N. tenuis had not been relocated in the wild at the time. What Clarke called N. gracillima was also not seen by him in the field; this taxon is now known as N. alba.

== Content ==
The book describes and illustrates 34 species in detail. A further two "undescribed and incompletely diagnosed taxa" are included: Nepenthes species A (later described as N. rigidifolia) and Nepenthes species B (later described as N. izumiae). Three "little known taxa" are also covered: N. alata (which is shown to be absent from the region), N. beccariana, and N. junghuhnii. The monograph also provides brief descriptions of 18 selected natural hybrids.

Clarke reversed several of the taxonomic revisions made by Matthew Jebb and Martin Cheek in their 1997 monograph, "A skeletal revision of Nepenthes (Nepenthaceae)". Nepenthes longifolia, N. talangensis, and N. tenuis were restored to species status, while N. pectinata was reduced to a heterotypic synonym of N. gymnamphora. Nepenthes jacquelineae, named after Clarke's wife, was described as a new species. Clarke also interpreted N. pyriformis (formally described in 2001) as a natural hybrid between N. inermis and N. talangensis.

=== Species ===
The following taxa are covered in the book, with 34 recognised as valid species (though some, such as N. angasanensis, only tentatively so).

1. N. adnata
2. N. albomarginata
3. N. ampullaria
4. N. angasanensis
5. N. aristolochioides
6. N. benstonei
7. N. bongso
8. N. densiflora
9. N. diatas
10. N. dubia
11. N. eustachya
12. N. gracilis
13. N. gracillima
14. N. gymnamphora
15. N. inermis
16. N. jacquelineae
17. N. lavicola
18. N. longifolia
19. N. macfarlanei
20. N. mikei
21. N. mirabilis
22. N. ovata
23. N. rafflesiana
24. N. ramispina
25. N. reinwardtiana
26. N. rhombicaulis
27. N. sanguinea
28. N. singalana
29. N. spathulata
30. N. spectabilis
31. N. sumatrana
32. N. talangensis
33. N. tenuis
34. N. tobaica

Little known taxa

1. N. alata
2. N. beccariana
3. N. junghuhnii

Undescribed and incompletely diagnosed taxa

1. N. species A (N. rigidifolia)
2. N. species B (N. izumiae)

== Reviews ==
Taxonomist Jan Schlauer reviewed Nepenthes of Sumatra and Peninsular Malaysia in the March 2002 issue of the Carnivorous Plant Newsletter.

The author has achieved a remarkable goal, viz. to study almost all species of Nepenthes occurring in the title area in situ, to review their taxonomy, to gather new insights in their ecology, and to present all this valuable information in a concise but entertaining form, accompanied by pictures of unprecedented quality and beauty.

Schlauer also wrote that "there are almost no obvious mistakes in the text" and praised the publication for its treatment of "highly controversial taxonomic issues [...] in a diplomatic yet explicit way".

In a literature review for the December 2001 issue of the Bulletin of the Australian Carnivorous Plant Society, Robert Gibson wrote:

In conclusion, this book blends ecology and taxonomy together with abundant eye catching photos and thoughtful text. It therefore has appeal to natural history scientists as well as carnivorous plant enthusiasts. It sets a higher standard for carnivorous plant publications and fills a significant gap in published information on a centre of diversity for a large (both in stature and number of taxa) carnivorous plant.

Nepenthes of Sumatra and Peninsular Malaysia was also reviewed by Ivo Koudela in a 2002 issue of Trifid.
