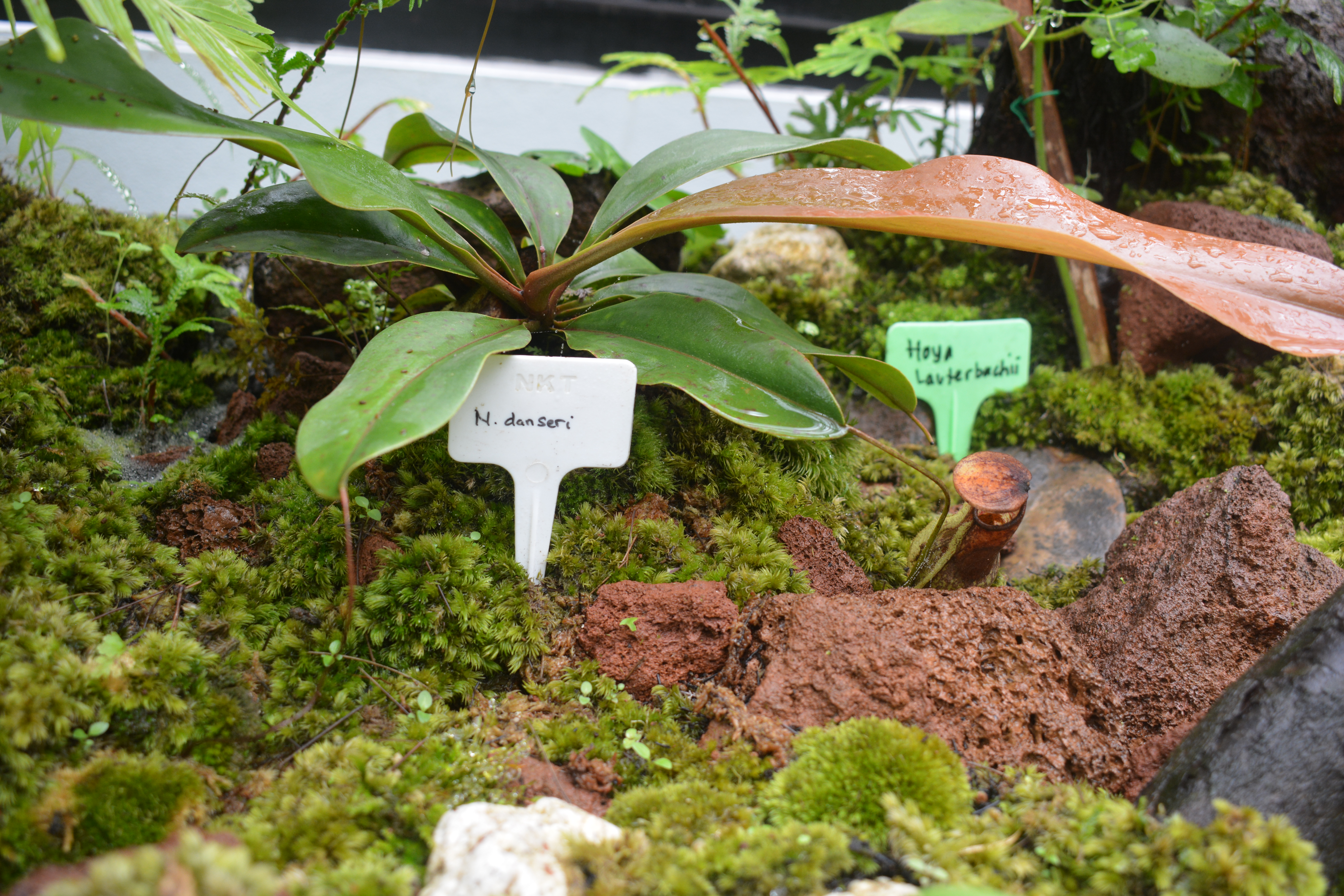
- Nepenthes danseri in the Bogor Botanical Gardens

Conservation status
- Vulnerable (IUCN 2.3)

Scientific classification
- Kingdom: Plantae
- Clade: Embryophytes
- Clade: Tracheophytes
- Clade: Angiosperms
- Clade: Eudicots
- Order: Caryophyllales
- Family: Nepenthaceae
- Genus: Nepenthes
- Species: N. danseri

Binomial name
- Nepenthes danseri Jebb & Cheek (1997)

Synonyms
- Nepenthes sp. Jebb (1991)

= Nepenthes danseri =

Species of pitcher plant from Indonesia

Nepenthes danseri (/nɪˈpɛnθiːz ˈdænsəraɪ/; after B. H. Danser, botanist) is a species of tropical pitcher plant. It is known only from the northern coast of Waigeo Island; plants from Halmahera, the largest of the Maluku Islands, are now recognised as belonging to a separate species, N. halmahera.

Nepenthes danseri was formally described in 1997 by Matthew Jebb and Martin Cheek in their monograph "A skeletal revision of Nepenthes (Nepenthaceae)", published in the botanical journal Blumea. However, the name N. danseri had already been in use since at least 1994.

== Habitat ==
Nepenthes danseri most commonly inhabits open scrub or bare soils on ultramafic rock. Plants also occur in forest, but these do not produce pitchers, probably due to the high light requirements of this species. Nepenthes danseri has been recorded from sea level to 320 m altitude.

Nepenthes danseri has no known natural hybrids. No forms or varieties have been described.
