= Mount Talakmau =

Volcano in west Sumatra, Indonesia

Talakmau
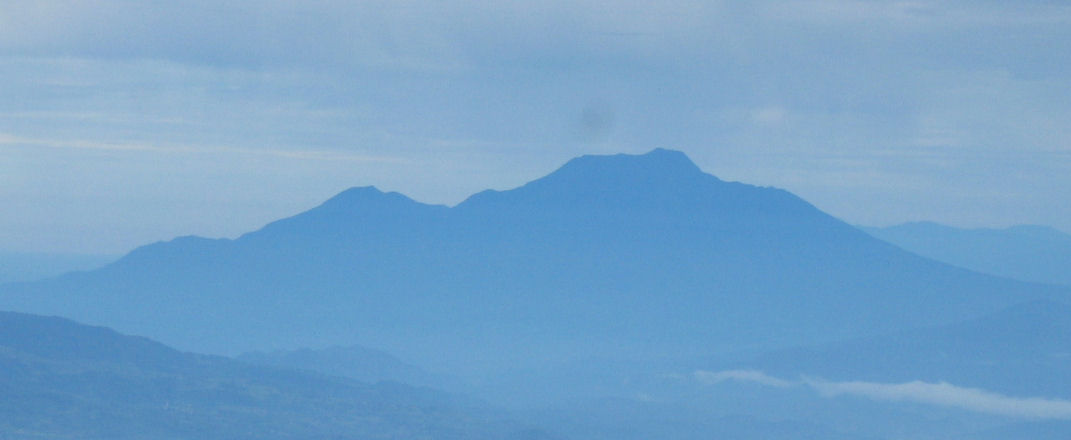
- Talakmau as seen from Marapi

Highest point
- Elevation: 2,919 m (9,577 ft)
- Listing: Ultra; Ribu
- Coordinates: 0°4′45″N 99°59′0″E

Geography
- Location within Sumatra Location within Indonesia
- Location: West Sumatra, Indonesia
- Parent range: Barisan Mountains

Geology
- Mountain type: Complex volcano
- Volcanic arc: Sunda Arc

Talakmau (also known as Gunung Ophir) is a volcano in West Sumatra, Indonesia. Its elevation is 2,919 m (9,577 ft). It is more than 700 m above its twin volcano Pasaman to the SW.

== See also ==
- List of volcanoes in Indonesia
