= A skeletal revision of Nepenthes (Nepenthaceae) =

1997 paper by Matthew Jebb and Martin Cheek

The issue of Blumea in which Jebb and Cheek's monograph was published

"A skeletal revision of Nepenthes (Nepenthaceae)" is a monograph by Matthew Jebb and Martin Cheek on the tropical pitcher plants of the genus Nepenthes. It was published in the May 1997 issue of the botanical journal Blumea. The work represented the first revision of the entire genus since John Muirhead Macfarlane's 1908 monograph. Jebb and Cheek's revision was based on "collaborative work by both authors since 1984, largely on herbarium specimens, but including fieldwork in New Guinea, Indonesia, Malaysia, Singapore and Madagascar". It was a precursor to their more exhaustive 2001 monograph, "Nepenthaceae".

== Content ==
The authors recognised 82 species, including six described for the first time: N. argentii, N. aristolochioides, N. danseri, N. diatas, N. lamii, and N. murudensis. Additionally, N. macrophylla was raised to a species from infraspecific rank. Jebb and Cheek also included five "little known taxa": N. deaniana, N. junghuhnii, N. melamphora var. lucida, N. neglecta, and N. smilesii. Three taxa were excluded: N. cincta, N. cristata, and N. lindleyana. Three widespread natural hybrids were also covered.

Jebb and Cheek revised several of the taxonomic determinations made in B. H. Danser's influential 1928 monograph, "The Nepenthaceae of the Netherlands Indies". This included the recognition of N. eustachya, N. hispida, N. ramispina, and N. sumatrana as distinct species, whereas previously they had been treated as heterotypic synonyms of N. alata, N. hirsuta, N. gracillima, and N. treubiana, respectively. Jebb and Cheek also reduced Danser's N. carunculata to N. bongso and N. leptochila to N. hirsuta. A number of more recently described species were also sunk in synonymy, including N. faizaliana and N. sandakanensis to synonyms of N. stenophylla, N. longifolia to a synonym of N. sumatrana, N. talangensis to a synonym of N. bongso, N. tenuis to a synonym of N. dubia, and N. xiphioides to a synonym of N. pectinata. The authors also lectotypified a number of names.

Nepenthes of Borneo by Charles Clarke was published in the same year as Jebb and Cheek's revision. Unlike the latter work, however, it was primarily an ecological monograph and did not attempt to provide an alternative taxonomic interpretation of the Bornean taxa (with the exception of treating N. borneensis in synonymy with N. boschiana and retaining N. faizaliana as a distinct species). However, several of the taxonomic revisions made by Jebb and Cheek were reversed in Clarke's subsequent monograph, Nepenthes of Sumatra and Peninsular Malaysia, published in 2001.

== Reviews ==
Taxonomist Jan Schlauer reviewed "A skeletal revision of Nepenthes (Nepenthaceae)" in the September 1998 issue of the Carnivorous Plant Newsletter.

The paper is a must for all interested seriously in the taxonomy of Nepenthes, and it is another important step towards an improvement of Danser's classical treatment. However, several debatable points have to be clarified previous to the completion of the Flora Malesiana account.

Schlauer disagreed with Jebb and Cheek's synonymisation of N. talangensis with N. bongso and their interpretation of N. stenophylla, which, according to Schlauer, served to perpetuate "Danser's misconception".

"A skeletal revision of Nepenthes (Nepenthaceae)" was also reviewed by Zdeněk Žáček in a 1997 issue of Trifid.
