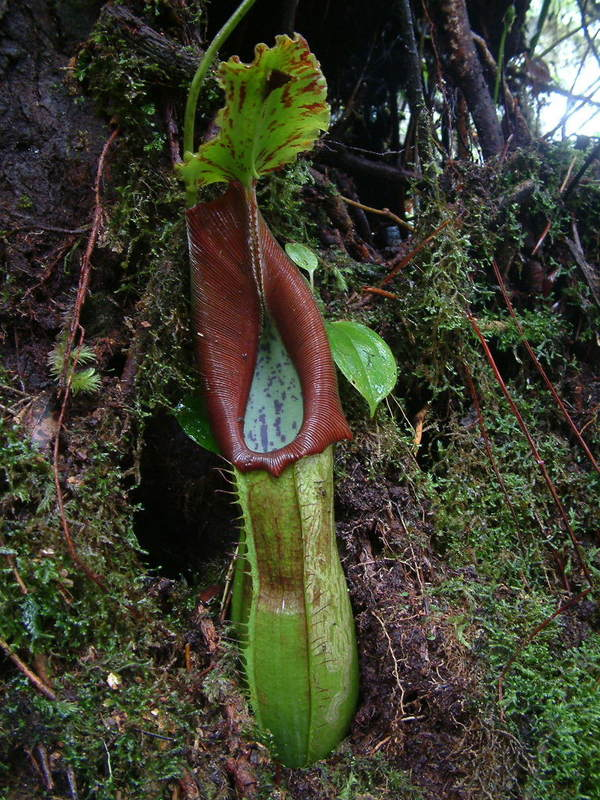
- A large lower pitcher of Nepenthes naga

Conservation status
- Vulnerable (IUCN 3.1)

Scientific classification
- Kingdom: Plantae
- Clade: Tracheophytes
- Clade: Angiosperms
- Clade: Eudicots
- Order: Caryophyllales
- Family: Nepenthaceae
- Genus: Nepenthes
- Species: N. naga

Binomial name
- Nepenthes naga Akhriadi, Hernawati, Primaldhi & M.Hambali (2009)

= Nepenthes naga =

Species of pitcher plant from Sumatra

Nepenthes naga is a tropical pitcher plant endemic to the Barisan Mountains of Sumatra. It is characterised by a forked sub-apical appendage on the underside of the lid and an undulate lid margin. The specific epithet naga is the Indonesian word for "dragon" and refers to the distinctive lid appendage of this species as well as the large size of its pitchers. The name also references local folklore, which tells of dragons occurring in this species's habitat in the past.

== Botanical history ==
Nepenthes naga was first collected by Indonesian hobbyists between March and July 2007 as part of an expedition by Division Nepenthes Indonesia. The herbarium specimen A.Primaldhi & M.Hambali DivNep052 is the designated holotype, and is deposited at the herbarium of Andalas University (ANDA), near Padang, West Sumatra. An isotype is deposited at Herbarium Bogoriense (BO), the herbarium of the Bogor Botanical Gardens. The specimen was collected by Alfindra Primaldhi and Muhammad Hambali on July 27, 2007, at an elevation of between 1,500 and 2,000 m.

The species was formally described^{[note a]} by Pitra Akhriadi, Hernawati, Alfindra Primaldhi and Muhammad Hambali in a 2009 issue of the botanical journal Reinwardtia. The description includes a line drawing of the type specimen by Hernawati, showing lower and upper pitchers as well as a female inflorescence.

== Description ==
Nepenthes naga is a climbing plant growing to a height of around 5 m. The stem is up to 1 cm in diameter. Internodes are circular to rhomboid in cross section and up to 14.8 cm long.

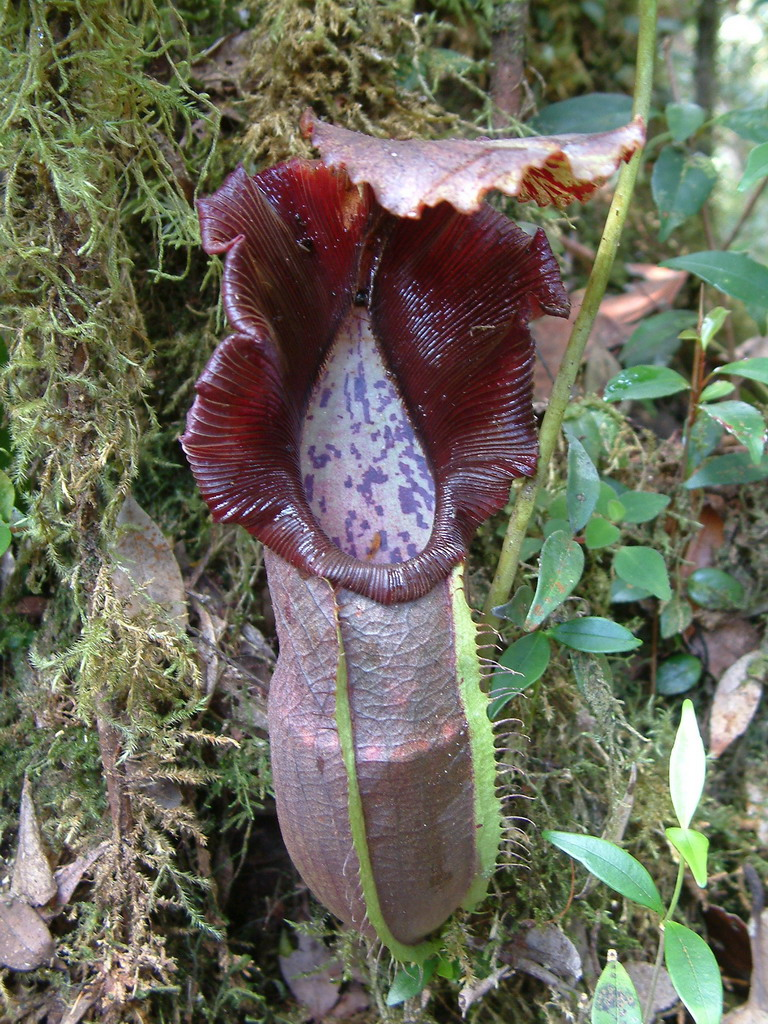
A rosette pitcher with a greatly expanded peristome

The leaves are sessile. The lamina or leaf blade is spathulate to oblong in shape and coriaceous (leathery) in texture. The leaves of rosettes are up to 27 cm long by 7.8 cm wide, whereas those of the climbing stem are up to 16 cm long by 6 cm wide. The base of the lamina clasps the stem by one-half to three-quarters of its circumference. The midrib is concave on the upper surface and triangular on the lower surface. Three longitudinal veins are present on either side of the midrib, although they are only distinct on the underside. Pinnate veins are indistinct. The lamina has an entire margin and a slightly emarginate to rotundate apex. In rosettes, the tendrils are up to 41 cm long and have a peltate attachment, joining the lamina around 0.3 cm before its apex. Tendrils produced on the climbing stem are inserted apically and are up to 28 cm long.

Rosette and lower pitchers are ovoid in the lower part, becoming cylindrical above. They are large, growing to 33.5 cm high by 6.8 cm wide. A pair of fringed wings (≤0.5 cm wide) runs down the ventral surface of the pitcher cup. Fringe elements are up to 1.9 cm long. The pitcher mouth is ovate and elongated into a short neck at the rear. The greatly expanded peristome may be up to 5.8 cm wide at the sides. Its inner margin is lined with distinct teeth, with those of the neck reaching 0.4 cm in length. The pitcher lid or operculum is ovate and has an unusual undulate margin. It measures up to 8.5 cm in length by 7.2 cm in width and has a cordate base. Four to five pairs of veins are visible on the upper surface of the lid. The lid bears two prominent appendages on its lower surface. The first is a hooked basal crest up to 0.7 cm long. The second is a triangular, dichotomous appendage present near the apex. This unique feature measures up to 1.4 cm in length and bears large nectar glands (0.5 to 1 mm in diameter). Smaller glands (0.1 to 0.5 mm in diameter) are concentrated along the midrib. An unbranched spur (≤2.8 cm long) is inserted near the base of the lid.

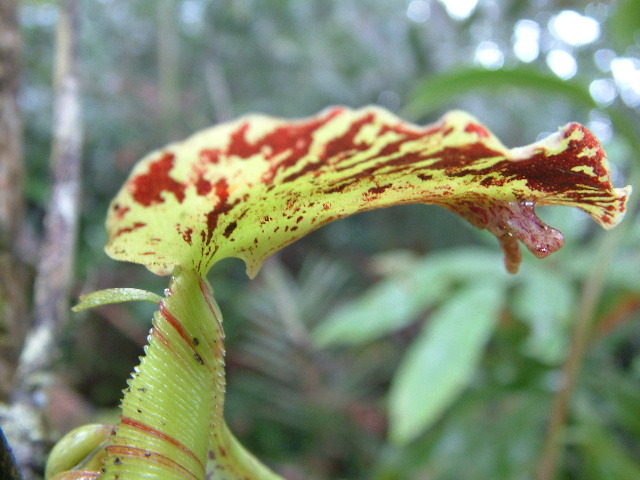
The underside of the lid of N. naga, showing a prominent hook-shaped basal crest and the forked sub-apical appendage for which it is named

Upper pitchers are infundibular in the lowermost part, becoming ovoid and then cylindrical above. They may be up to 24.3 cm high by 4.5 cm wide. A pair of ribs is present instead of wings. The mouth is ovate and has a neck. The peristome is much narrower than that found in lower pitchers, measuring only up to 1 cm in width. Its teeth, although distinct, are also much shorter, with those of the neck reaching 1.3 mm. The fringed lid is ovate, has a cordate base, and measures up to 6.1 cm in length by 5.5 cm in width. Three to four pairs of veins are visible on the upper surface of the lid. As in their terrestrial counterparts, the lid of aerial pitchers bears two appendages on its underside. The hook-shaped basal crest is up to 0.3 cm long, while the forked sub-apical appendage reaches 1.5 cm. The latter bears large nectar glands (0.5 to 1 mm in diameter), with smaller ones (0.1 to 0.2 mm in diameter) concentrated along the lid midrib's lower surface. The spur (≤1.4 cm long) is flattened and has a bifurcate apex.

Only the female inflorescence of N. naga is known. It is a raceme measuring up to 14.5 cm in length, of which the peduncle makes up 7 cm and the rachis 7.5 cm. Partial peduncles are one- or two-flowered. Their unbranched basal portion is up to 0.5 cm long, while the branches reach 0.9 cm. Bracteoles are linear and up to 1.2 cm long. Tepals measure up to 0.5 cm. Fruits are up to 1 cm long by 0.4 cm wide.

Nepenthes naga lacks a conspicuous indumentum; most parts of the plant are glabrous.

== Ecology ==
Nepenthes naga is known only from a small population in the Barisan Mountains of North Sumatra. It grows epiphytically in mossy montane forest and has an altitudinal distribution of 1,500–2,000 m above sea level. The vegetation in this habitat is dominated by Fagaceae and Gleicheniaceae, as well as various montane shrubs.

Nepenthes naga occurs in an unprotected area. Plantations of the Pará rubber tree (Hevea brasiliensis) at the foot of the hill inhabited by N. naga pose a threat to this species. Population decline is also attributed to plant collectors, who have removed a number of plants and collect seeds in such numbers that few are left to germinate naturally.

The species has no known natural hybrids.

== Related species ==
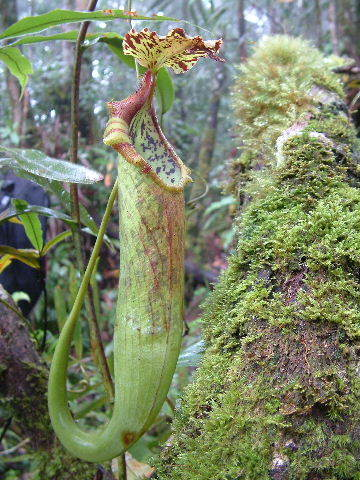
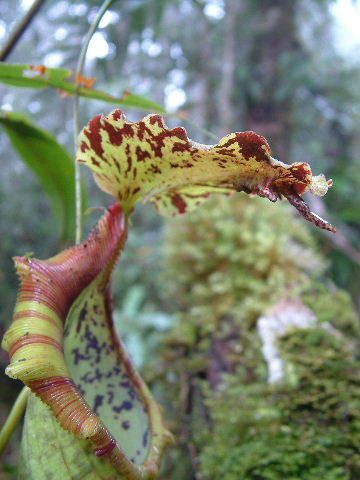
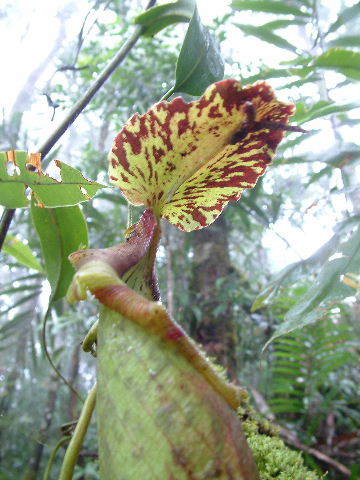
An upper pitcher of N. naga bearing a highly developed filiform appendage and frilled lid, which distinguish this species from its closest relatives in the genus

In their description of N. naga, the authors compared it to the Sumatran endemics N. ovata and N. spathulata, contending that it can be distinguished from these species on the basis of its dichotomous lid appendage and frilled lid. Nepenthes naga is nonetheless very similar to these species and to N. bongso, and may prove to be an aberrant form of one of them. Populations of N. bongso exhibiting a similarly branching lid appendage have been discovered and "[m]ost authorities believe that [N. naga] falls within the range of variation of N. bongso.

== Notes ==
a. The original Latin description of N. naga reads:

Nepenthidi spathulatae similis, ascidia operculo facie inferiore appendice subapicali triangulari serpentis linguae similis, operculi margine undulato differt.
