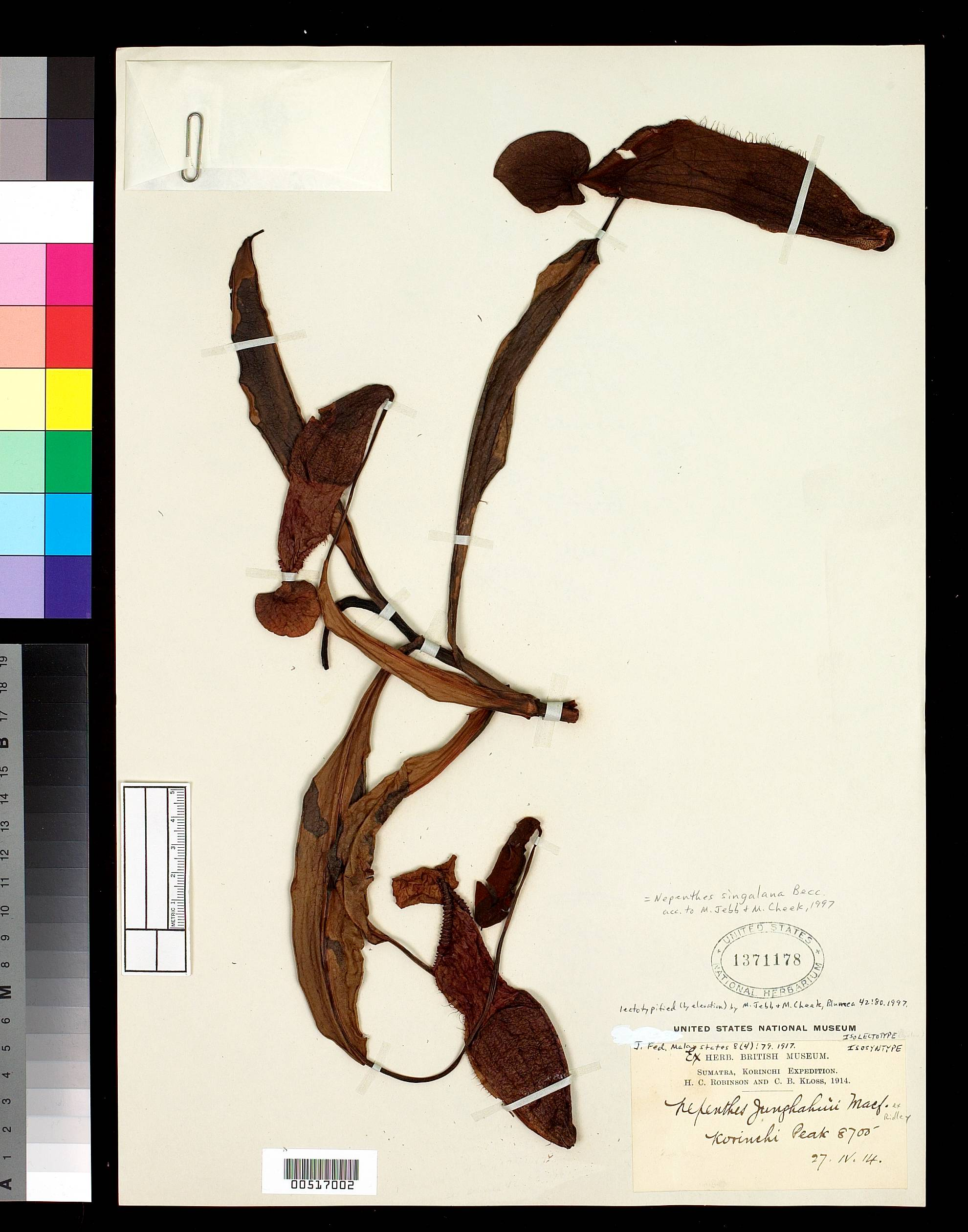
- Isolectotype of N. junghuhnii Macfarl. ex Ridl., a taxon now considered synonymous with N. singalana and different from the plant Macfarlane informally called N. junghuhnii. This specimen was collected by H. E. Robinson and C. B. Kloss on April 27, 1914, from Mount Kerinci, Sumatra.

Scientific classification
- Kingdom: Plantae
- Clade: Tracheophytes
- Clade: Angiosperms
- Clade: Eudicots
- Order: Caryophyllales
- Family: Nepenthaceae
- Genus: Nepenthes
- Species: N. junghuhnii

Binomial name
- Nepenthes junghuhnii sensu Macfarl. in sched. (1917) nom.nud.
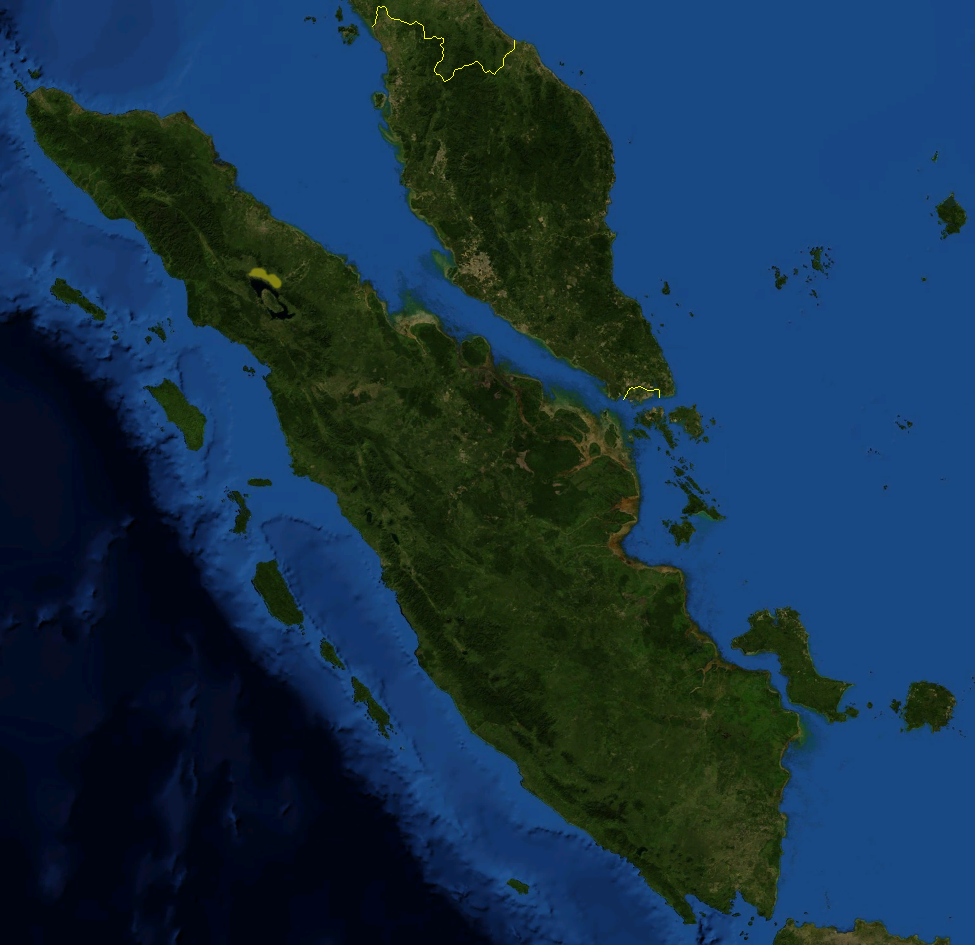
- Possible distribution of N. junghuhnii.

Synonyms
- Nepenthes junghuhnii Macfarl. ex Ridl. (1917) [=N. singalana]

= Nepenthes junghuhnii =

Species of pitcher plant from Sumatra

Nepenthes junghuhnii (/nɪˈpɛnθiːz jʊŋˈhuːniaɪ/; after Friedrich Franz Wilhelm Junghuhn, who collected it between 1840 and 1842) is a tropical pitcher plant native to Sumatra. This species has been the source of much confusion since its discovery. The taxon originally named N. junghuhnii by John Muirhead Macfarlane has never been formally published (Henry Nicholas Ridley's N. junghuhnii is a heterotypic synonym of N. singalana). In 1994, taxonomist Jan Schlauer described N. junghuhnii as a "rather dubious species based on insufficient specimens". Nepenthes junghuhnii sensu Macfarlane has not been relocated in the wild since the collection of the type specimen. It is characterised by strongly petiolate leaves and appears to be most closely related to N. bongso and N. spathulata; Schlauer considers it a possible synonym of the former.

Herbarium specimens informally named N. junghuhnii by Macfarlane were collected by Junghuhn in the Batak region of North Sumatra, near Lake Toba. The specimens of N. singalana that Ridley used to describe N. junghuhnii originated from a collection by Harold Ernest Robinson and Cecil Boden Kloss on Mount Kerinci, in the Sumatran province of Jambi.

In his 1928 monograph, "The Nepenthaceae of the Netherlands Indies", B. H. Danser wrote of this taxon:

N. Junghuhnii is based upon plants, collected by Junghuhn in Sumatra, named as such by Macfarlane in the Kew Herbarium and seen by Ridley, and with which the latter author identified specimens from G. Kerintji. I have not seen any of these plants and therefore I am not quite certain about them; however, in H. B. there are other plants, collected by Junghuhn in Sumatra and named N. Junghuhnii by Macfarlane, and it seems evident, that these plants may be identical with those in the Kew Herbarium. About the specimens from G. Kerintji, which, according to Ridley, are "undoubtedly the same species", I dare, of course, not say the same. However, the two numbers in H. B. named by Macfarlane seem to be not wholly identical. The first of the above mentioned plants is a form, certainly intermediate between N. sanguinea and N. singalana. The coarse stems and the large leaves are those of N. sanguinea, the pitchers are smaller than usually are those of N. sanguinea, their shape approaches that of the pitchers of N. singalana and the inflorescences are quite like those of the latter species. The second plant mentioned above is perhaps a piece of an identical plant, though it shows other characters. It is a fragment of the lower portion of a climbing stem; this stem and its leaves are like those of the first mentioned plant, but the pitchers differ from those of N. sanguinea only by the toothed interior margin of the peristome. When the latter character had been absent, I should not have hesitated to record N. sanguinea as occurring in Sumatra; also the provenance of the two mentioned plants from probably the same habitat has kept me from doing this. Of course it is possible, that both plants of Junghuhn represent a new species, but since the material at hand shows only characters intermediate between two species already known and between many related species intermediate forms have been found, I prefer to distinguish also these plants as such. It is very improbable that it is a hybrid, since pure N. sanguinea has not been found in Sumatra, and from the region where Junghuhn collected his plants N. singalana too has not been recorded. As is obvious from a letter written by Macfarlane and extant in the Leiden Herbarium this author intended to make a description of N. Junghuhnii for Koorders to be published in his Plantae Junghuhnianae lneditae, but apparently it had not come to that. The publication of Ridley, not written in Latin, is invalid from a nomenclatorial point of view.

Danser treated N. junghuhnii as a possible natural hybrid between N. singalana and N. sanguinea. The latter species is now known to be absent from Sumatra.
