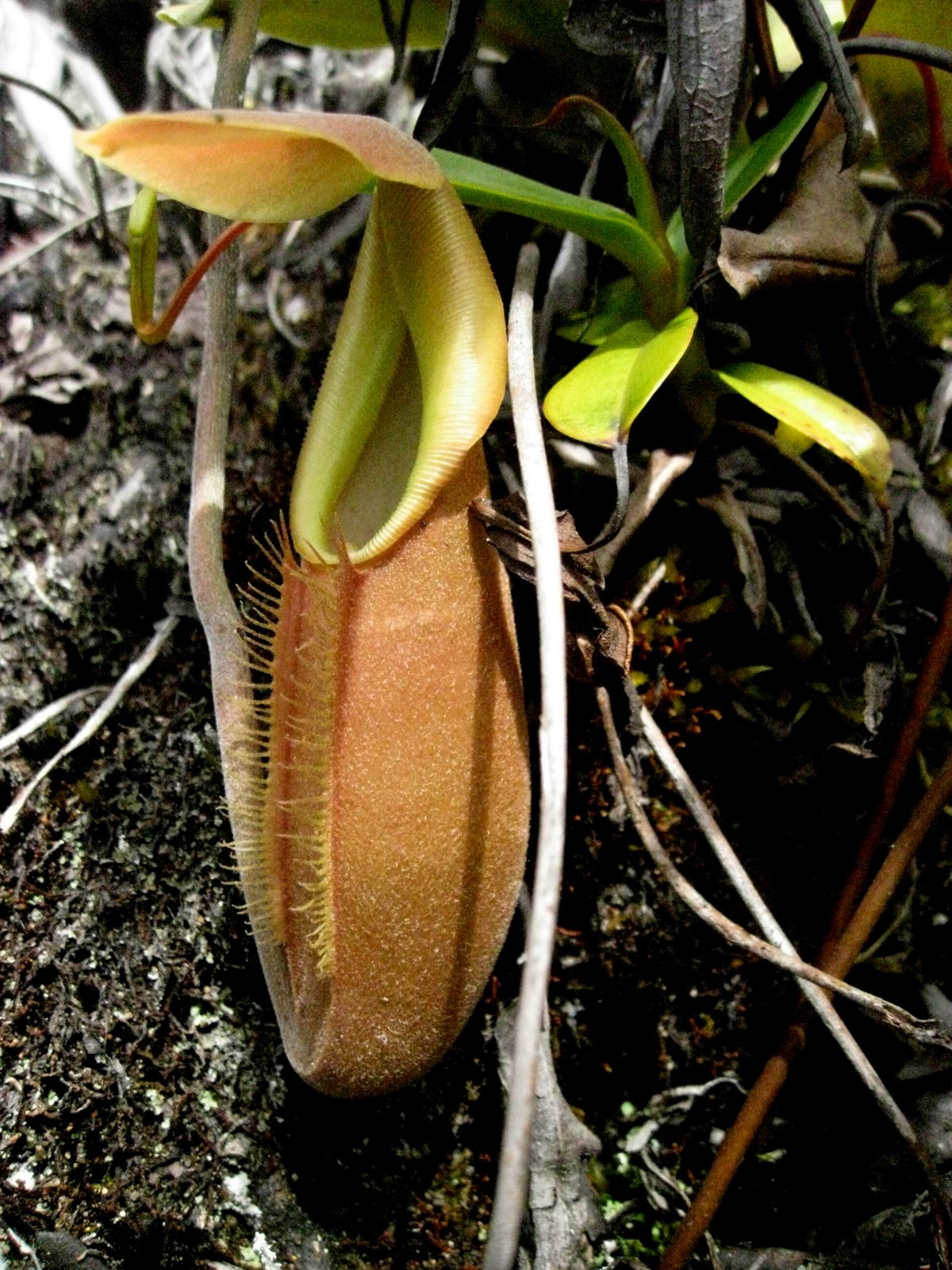
- A freshly opened lower pitcher
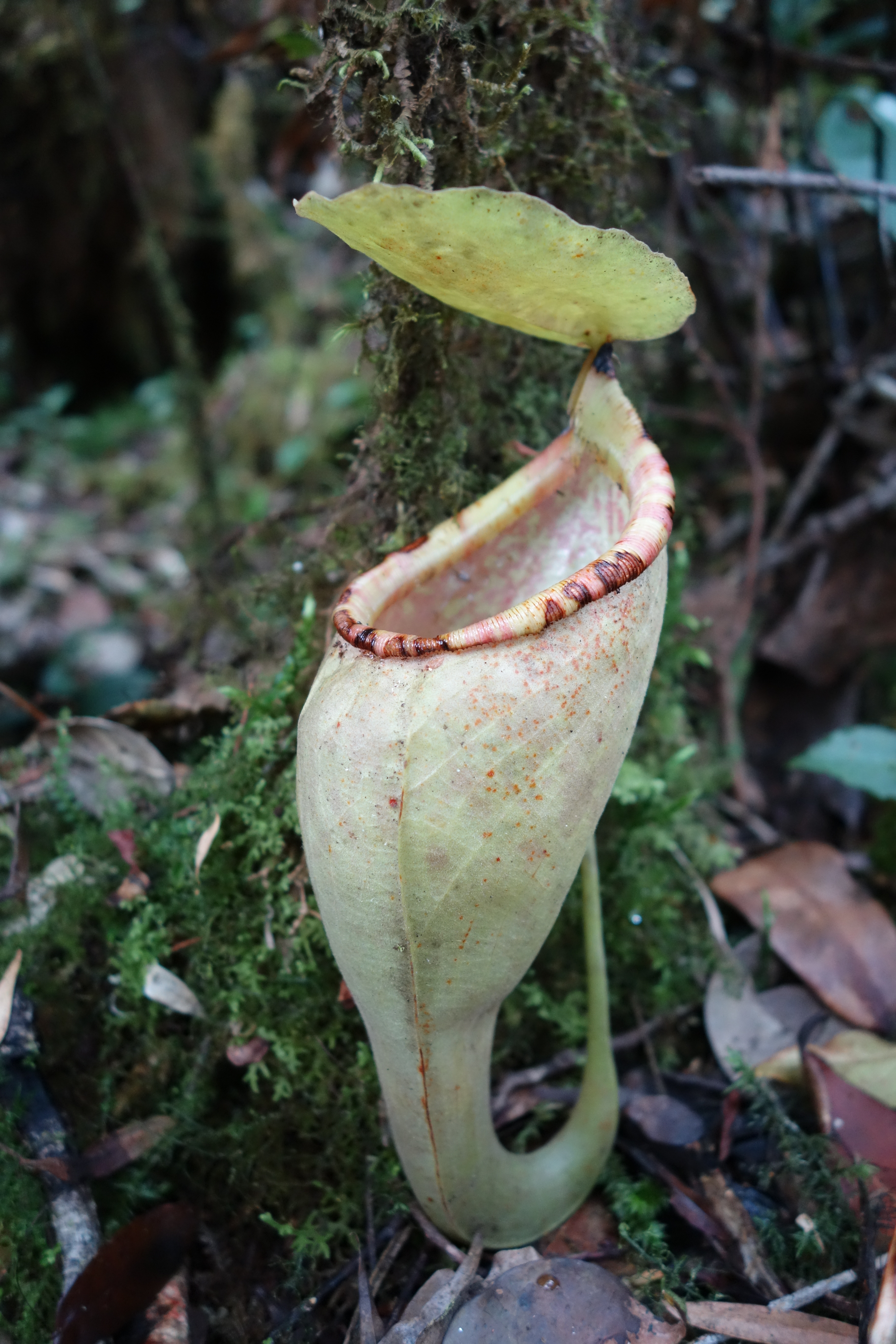
- An upper pitcher of a variant sometimes distinguished as N. carunculata, from a minor peak near Solok, West Sumatra

Conservation status
- Least Concern (IUCN 3.1)

Scientific classification
- Kingdom: Plantae
- Clade: Tracheophytes
- Clade: Angiosperms
- Clade: Eudicots
- Order: Caryophyllales
- Family: Nepenthaceae
- Genus: Nepenthes
- Species: N. bongso

Binomial name
- Nepenthes bongso Korth. (1839)
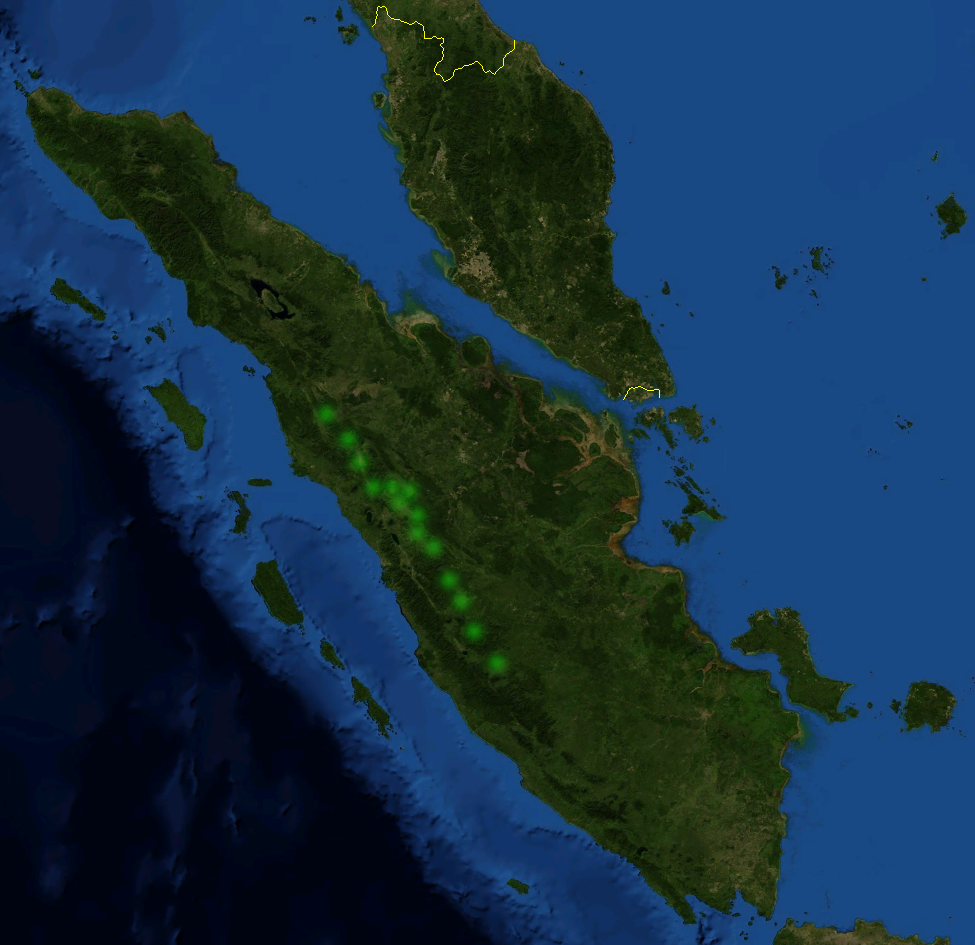
- Distribution of N. bongso

Synonyms
- Synonyms: Nepenthes carunculata Danser (1928); Nepenthes carunculata var. robusta Nerz & Wistuba (1994); Nepenthes singalana auct. non Becc.: Tamin & M.Hotta in M.Hotta (1986) [=N. bongso/N. densiflora?/N. gymnamphora/ N. lavicola/N. singalana/N. spathulata]; Heterochresonyms: Nepenthes bongso auct. non Korth.: Ridl. (1908) [=N. alba]; Nepenthes bongso auct. non Korth.: Guillaum. (1911) [=N. vieillardii]; Nepenthes bongso auct. non Korth.: Danser (1928); Sh.Kurata (1973) [=N. bongso/N. ovata/N. talangensis]; Nepenthes bongso auct. non Korth.: Tamin & M.Hotta in M.Hotta (1986) [=N. bongso/N. dubia/N. inermis]; Nepenthes bongso auct. non Korth.: Hopkins, Maulder & B.R.Salmon (1990) [=N. talangensis]; Nepenthes bongso auct. non Korth.: Jebb & Cheek (1997); Cheek & Jebb (2001) [=N. bongso/N. talangensis]

= Nepenthes bongso =

Species of pitcher plant from Sumatra

Nepenthes bongso /nɪˈpɛnθiːz ˈbɒŋsoʊ/ is a tropical pitcher plant endemic to Sumatra, where it has an altitudinal distribution of 1000–2700 m above sea level. The specific epithet bongso refers to the Indonesian legend of Putri Bungsu (literally "youngest daughter"), the spirit guardian of Mount Marapi.

== Taxonomy ==
The species was formally described by Pieter Willem Korthals in his 1839 monograph, "Over het geslacht Nepenthes".

Nepenthes carunculata^{[note a]} is considered a heterotypic synonym of N. bongso by most authorities. The infraspecific taxon Nepenthes carunculata var. robusta was described in 1994 by Joachim Nerz and Andreas Wistuba. It is an extreme variety of this taxon with a large, flared peristome.

In his Carnivorous Plant Database, taxonomist Jan Schlauer treats N. junghuhnii (sensu Macfarlane) as a possible synonym of N. bongso.

== Related species ==
Morphological differences between N. bongso, N. dubia, N. talangensis and N. tenuis (Nerz & Wistuba, 1994)
Character	N. bongso	N. dubia	N. talangensis	N. tenuis
Shape of upper pitchers	tubulate - infundibulate	tubulous in the lower part, infundibulate above the middle	tubulous to narrow infundibuliform in the lower half, ovate in the upper half	wide infundibulate, contracted below the mouth
Lid	orbiculate	narrow cuneate	broad-ovate	very narrow elliptical
Length/width ratio of upper pitchers	3.3	1.9	2.3	1.75

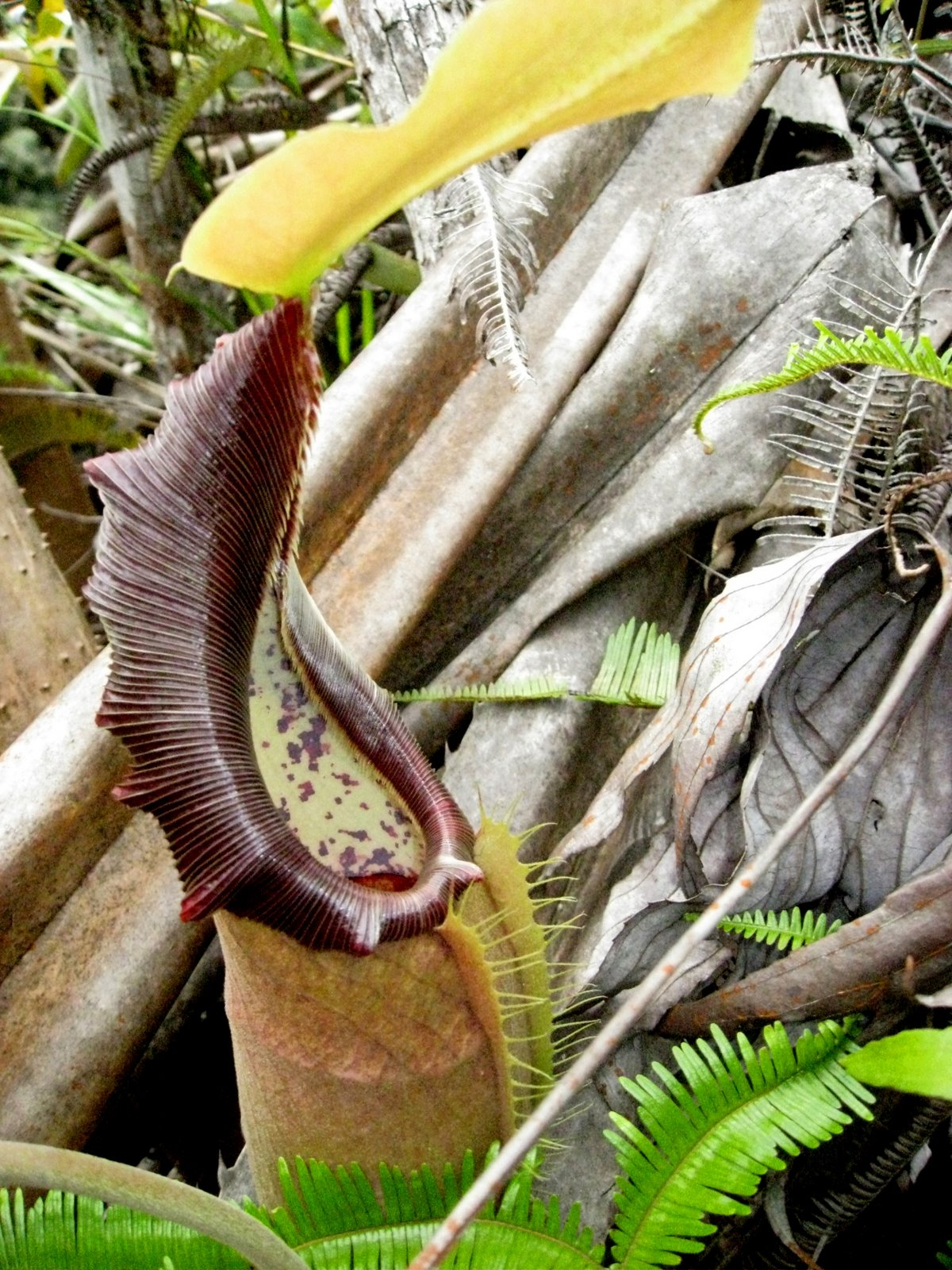
A typical lower pitcher of N. bongso

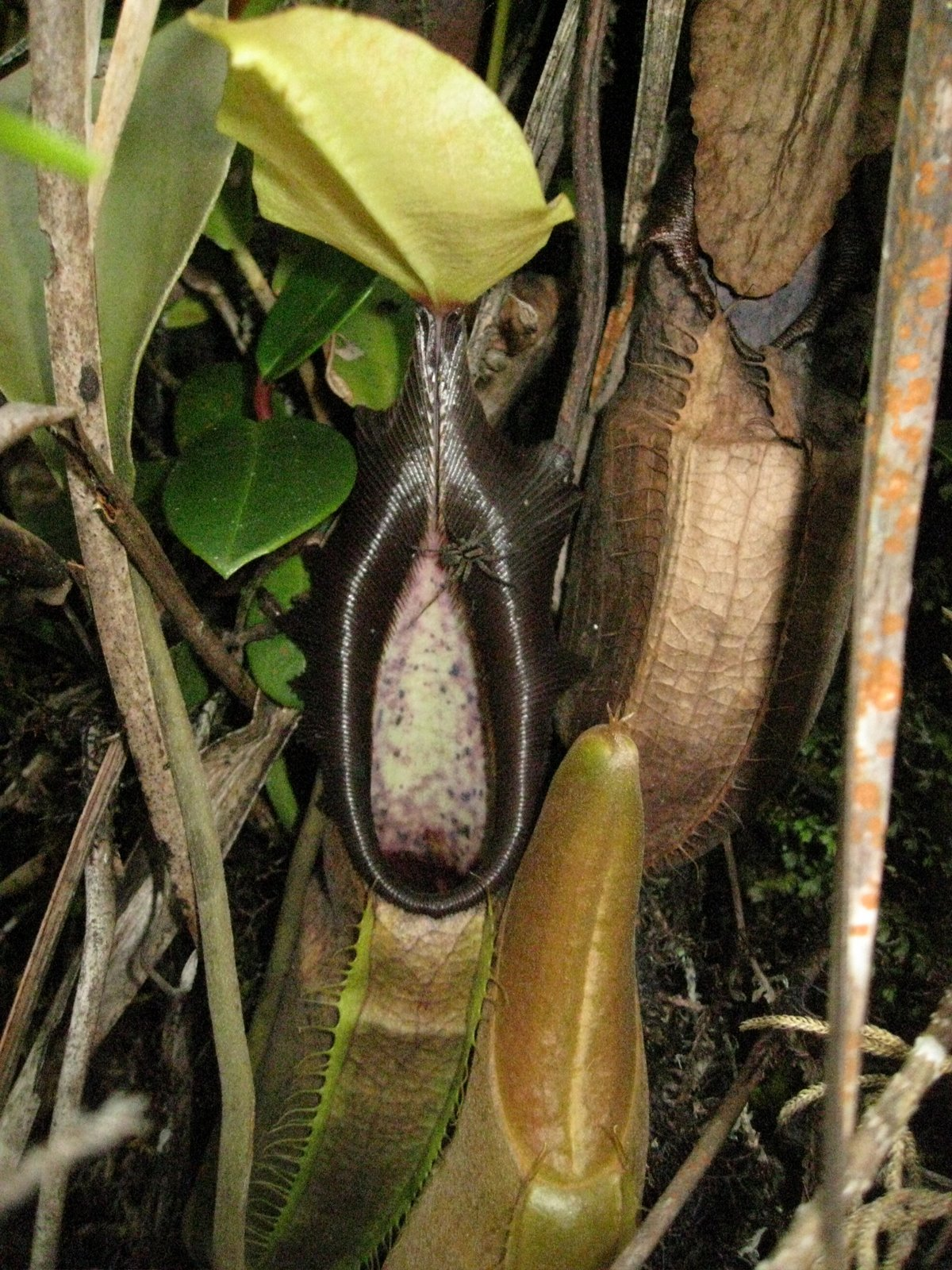
Lower pitchers (developing, open, and dried)

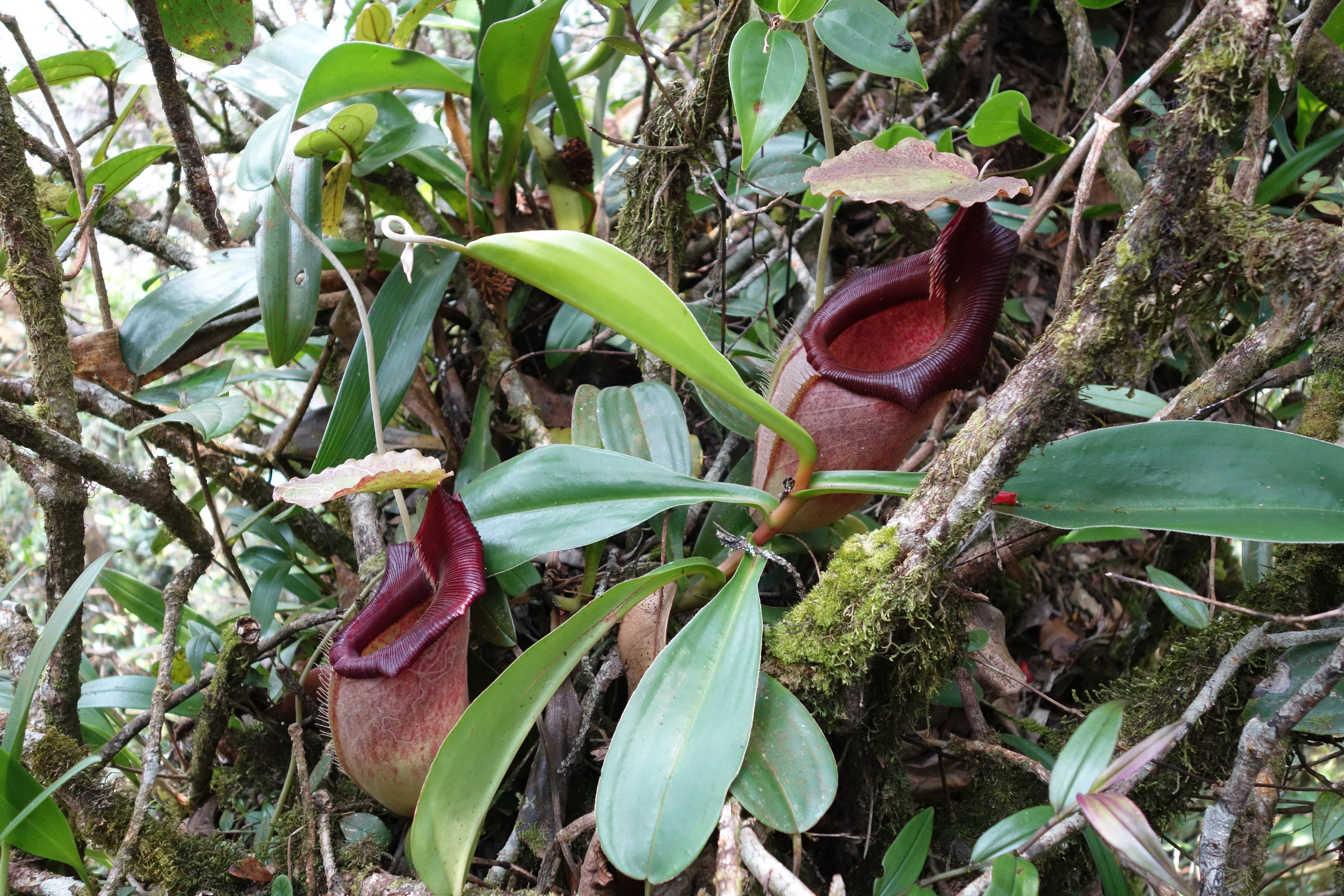
Lower pitchers of N. carunculata, which is often treated as a synonym

== Natural hybrids ==
The following natural hybrids involving N. bongso have been recorded.

- N. bongso × N. gymnamphora
- N. bongso × N. singalana
- N. bongso × N. talangensis

In his 1928 monograph "The Nepenthaceae of the Netherlands Indies", B. H. Danser mentioned what he thought was the hybrid N. bongso × N. pectinata; however, this plant material is now known to represent N. densiflora, a species described by Danser 12 years later.

== Notes ==
a. Nepenthes carunculata is pronounced /nɪˈpɛnθiːz kəˌrʌŋkjʊˈlɑːtə/. The specific epithet is derived from the Latin word caruncula, a diminutive of caro (flesh), and refers to the fleshy seed appendages of this taxon.
