= Mount Tanggamus =

Volcano in Sumatra, Indonesia

Tanggamus
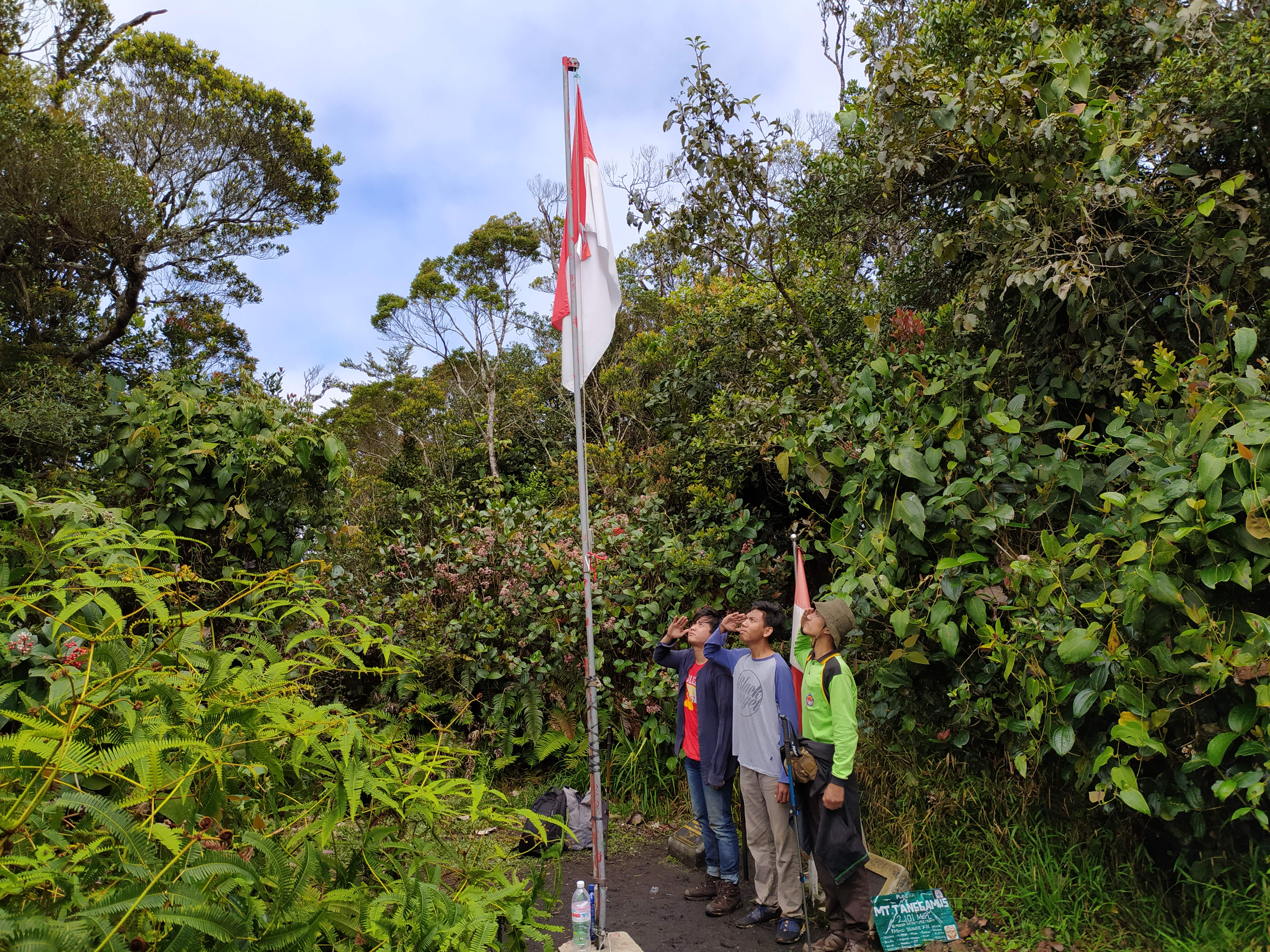
- Summit of Tanggamus

Highest point
- Elevation: 2,079 m (6,821 ft)
- Listing: Ultra; Ribu
- Coordinates: 5.427°S 104.675°E

Geography
- Location within Sumatra
- Location: Lampung Province

Geology
- Mountain type: Stratovolcano
- Volcanic arc: Sunda Arc
- Last eruption: Pleistocene

Tanggamus is a 2,079 m (6,821 ft) high Quaternary stratovolcano in southern Sumatra's Lampung Province. The volcano has no history of eruptions; the last is thought to be during the Pleistocene. Lahar deposits along the volcano, comprising andesite and pumice, have been dated to about 1.5 million years ago though they may be younger. Lava on Tanggamus was dated at 1.4 million years ago.

== See also ==
- List of volcanoes in Indonesia
