= Mount Tujuh =

Volcano in Barisan islands, Indonesia

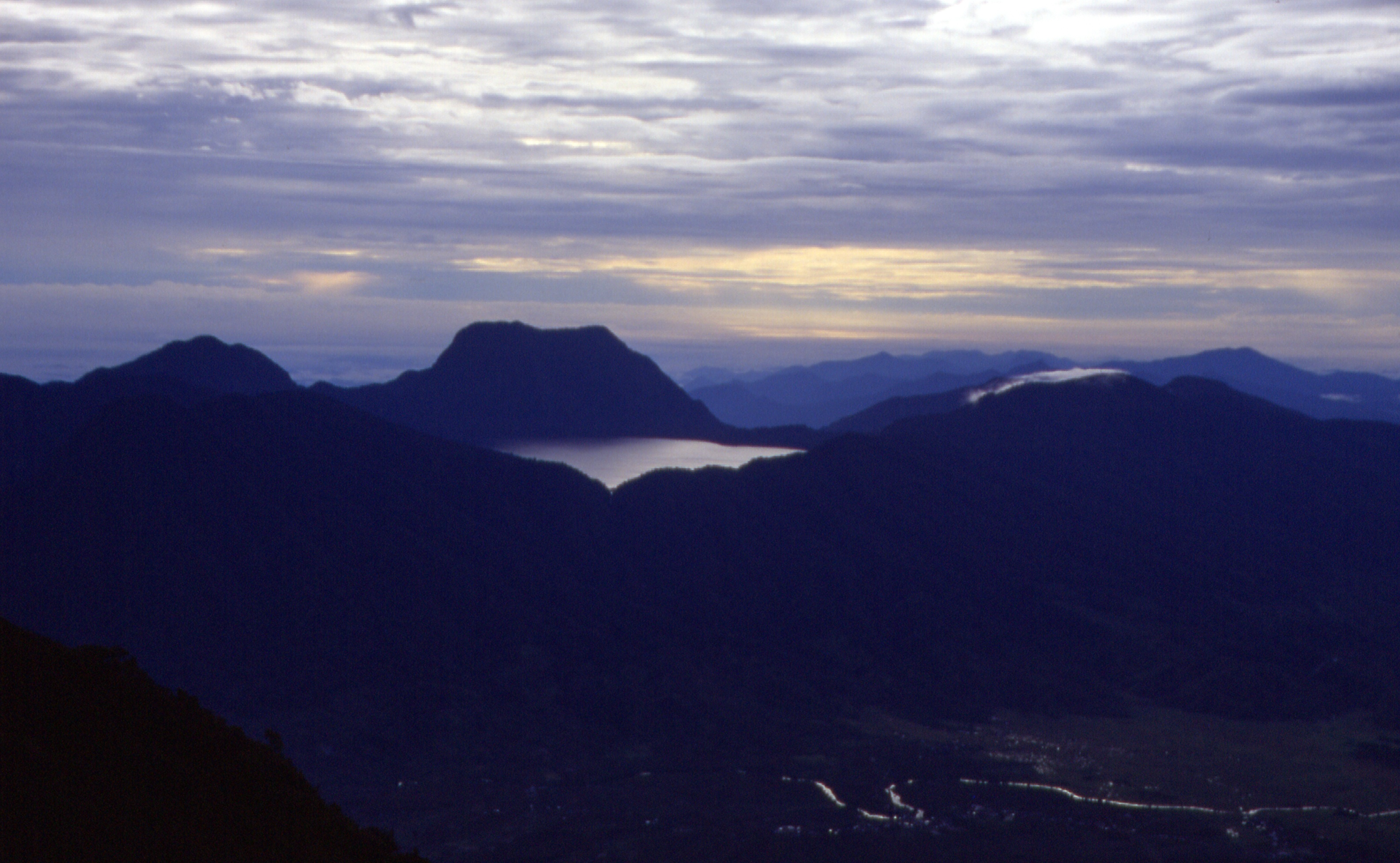

Highest point
- Elevation: 2,732 m (8,963 ft)
- Prominence: 1,250 m (4,100 ft)
- Listing: Ribu
- Coordinates: 1°40′29″S 101°25′30″E

Geography
- Location within Sumatra Location within Indonesia
- Location: Sumatra, Indonesia
- Parent range: Barisan Mountains

Geology
- Mountain type: Caldera
- Volcanic arc: Sunda Arc

Mount Tujuh (Indonesian: Gunung Tujuh) is a caldera volcano in the Barisan Mountains of Sumatra. It has seven (tujuh) peaks, of which only three have been climbed. Mount Tujuh has a large caldera lake at its centre, Lake Gunung Tujuh. It is located within Kerinci Seblat National Park.

The mountain supports one of only three known wild populations of the tropical pitcher plant Nepenthes aristolochioides.

== See also ==
- List of volcanoes in Indonesia
- Geography of Indonesia
