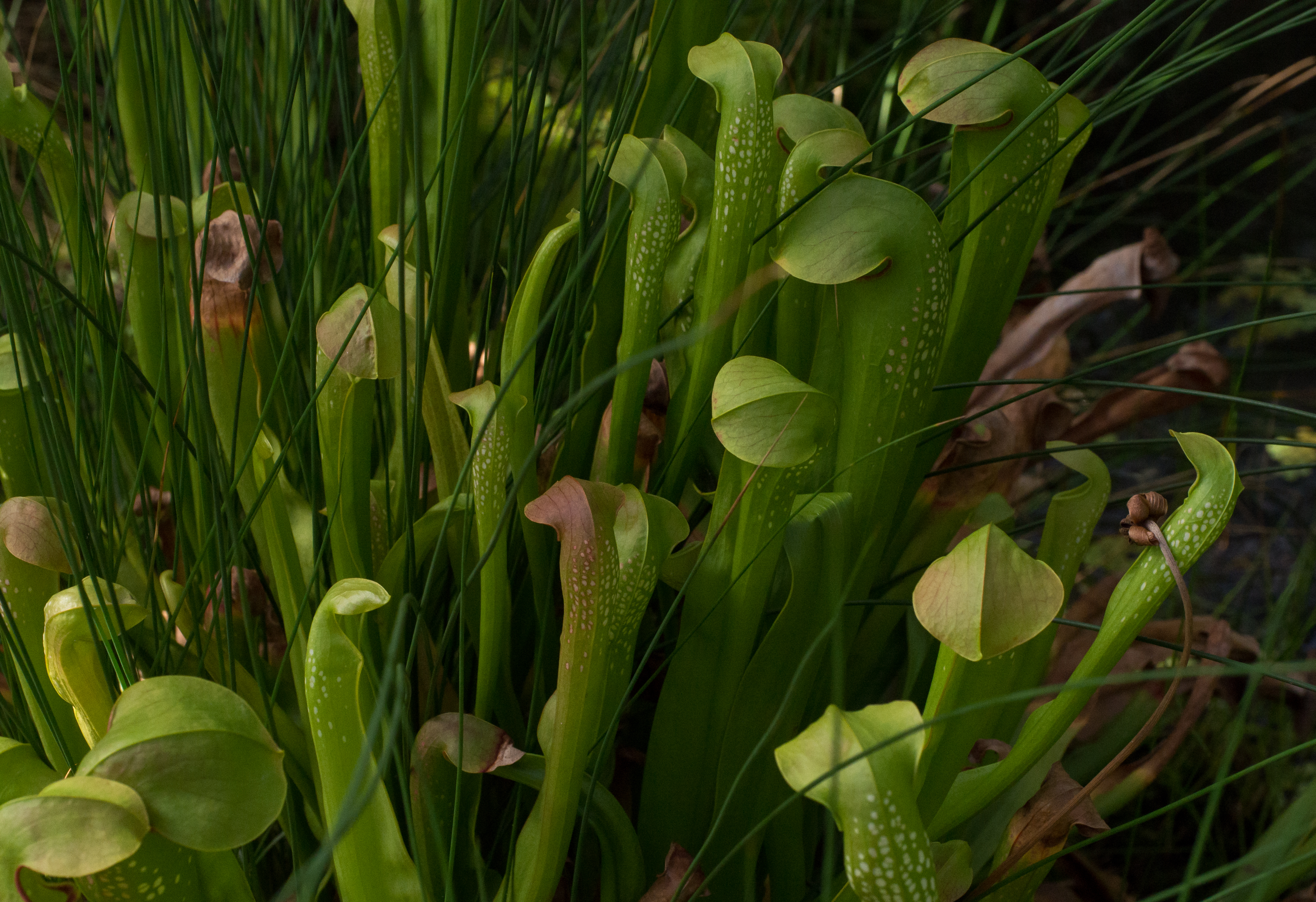
- Sarracenia minor at the Brooklyn Botanic Garden

Conservation status
- Least Concern (IUCN 2.3)

- Apparently Secure (NatureServe)
- CITES Appendix II

Scientific classification
- Kingdom: Plantae
- Clade: Tracheophytes
- Clade: Angiosperms
- Clade: Eudicots
- Clade: Asterids
- Order: Ericales
- Family: Sarraceniaceae
- Genus: Sarracenia
- Species: S. minor

Binomial name
- Sarracenia minor Walt. (1788)
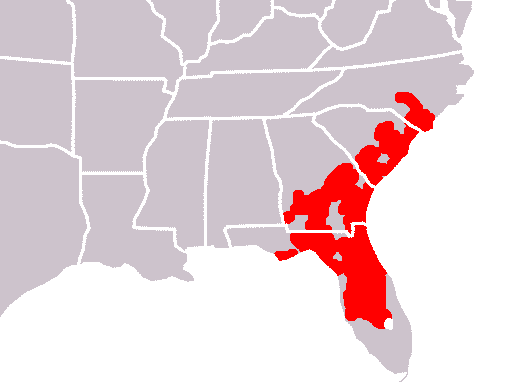
- Sarracenia minor range

= Sarracenia minor =

Species of carnivorous plant

Sarracenia minor, also known as the hooded pitcherplant, is a perennial, terrestrial, rhizomatous, herbaceous, carnivorous plant in the genus Sarracenia. Like all the Sarracenia, it is native to North America.

== Etymology ==
In 1788, the first description of S. minor was written by Thomas Walter. The specific epithet minor means "small" and refers to the typical size of the pitchers. The common name refers to the characteristic lid of this species.

== Description ==
The typical form is a relatively small plant with pitchers about 25–30 centimetres (10–12 in) in height. An especially large form, with pitchers up to 90–120 centimetres (3–4 ft) high, grows in the Okefenokee marshes, at the border between Georgia and Florida.

The tubes are mostly green throughout, but can also be reddish in the upper part. Flowering occurs from late March to mid-May. Flowers are yellow in colour and odorless. Over a hundred seeds are produced by a capsule.

Sarracenia minor and S. psittacina are the only species in the genus to employ domed pitchers with translucent white patches that allow light to enter. It has been suggested that the light shining through these patches attracts flying insects further into the pitcher and away from the pitcher's mouth in a similar manner to Darlingtonia californica and two Nepenthes species, N. aristolochioides and N. klossii. The pitcher is filled with water and enzymes produced by the plant and helpful in the digestion of prey. In the wild, Sarracenia minor seems very attractive to ants, although it also attracts and eats a wide range of flying insects.

== Distribution ==
This plant can be found in areas of northern and central Florida and in Georgia up to the southern part of North Carolina. The species exhibits the southernmost range of any member of the genus Sarracenia extending to fragmented populations surrounding Lake Okeechobee in south-central Florida.

== Habitat ==
It grows in swampy environments poor in nutrients such as nitrogen or phosphorus.

== Infraspecific taxa ==
- Sarracenia minor var. minor
- Sarracenia minor var. okefenokeensis Schnell (2002)

== Synonyms ==
- Sarracenia adunca Sm. (1804)
- ?Sarracenia galeata Bartr. (1791) nom.nud.
- Sarracenia lacunosa Bartr. (1794)
  [=S. leucophylla/S. minor]
- Sarracenia minor auct. non Walt.: Sweet (1832) [=S. rubra]
- Sarracenia variolaris Michx. (1803)

== Gallery ==
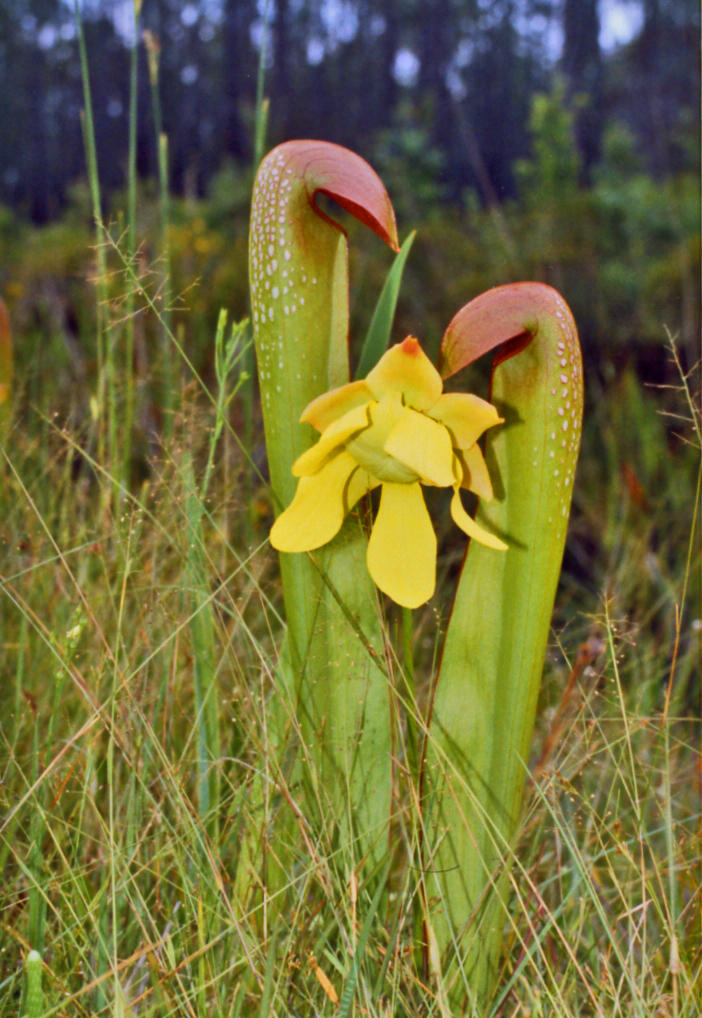
Sarracenia minor var. okefenokeensis at Okefenokee Swamp Park, Waycross, Georgia

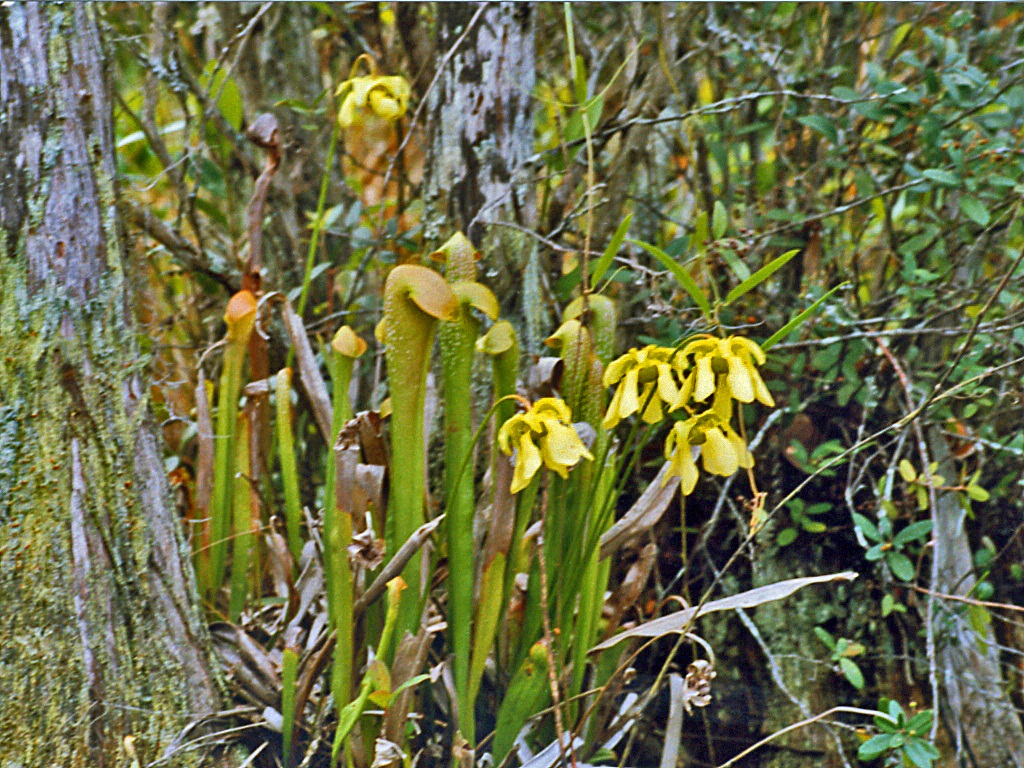
Plants of Sarracenia minor var. okefenokeensis in Okefenokee Swamp Park in Waycross, Georgia

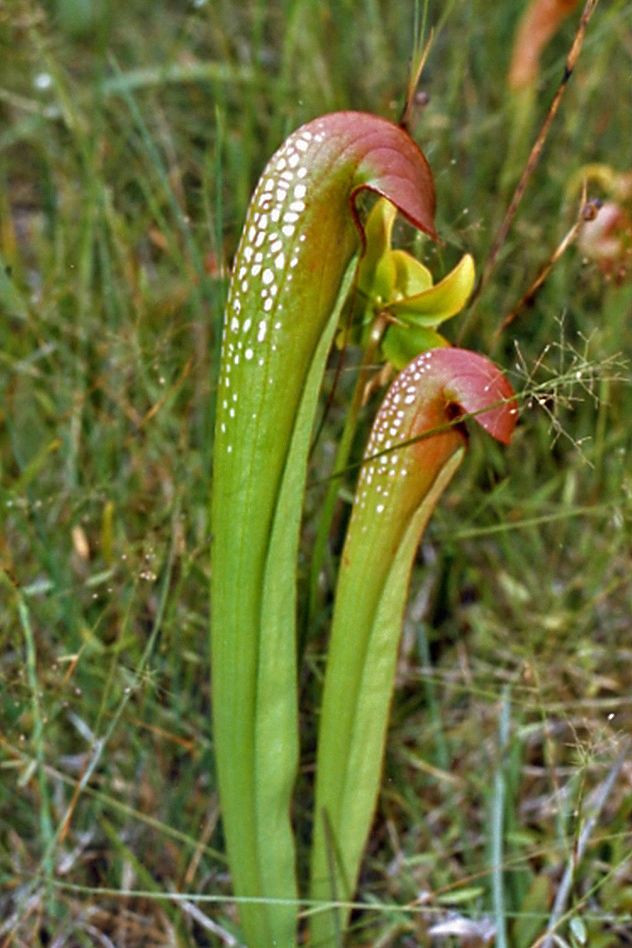
Sarracenia minor var. okefenokeensis

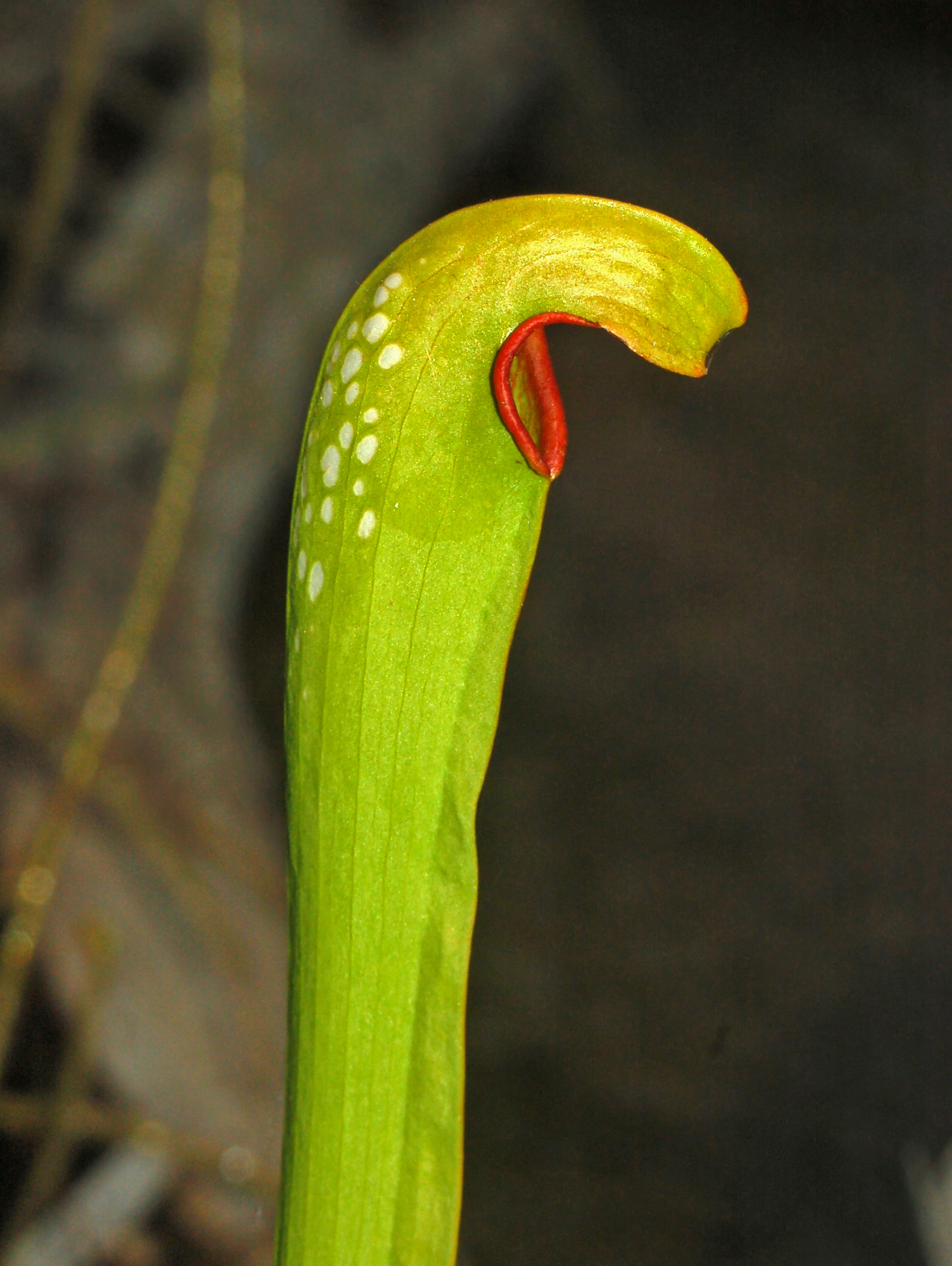
Sarracenia minor pitcher at the botanical garden of Villa Durazzo-Pallavicini, Genova Pegli

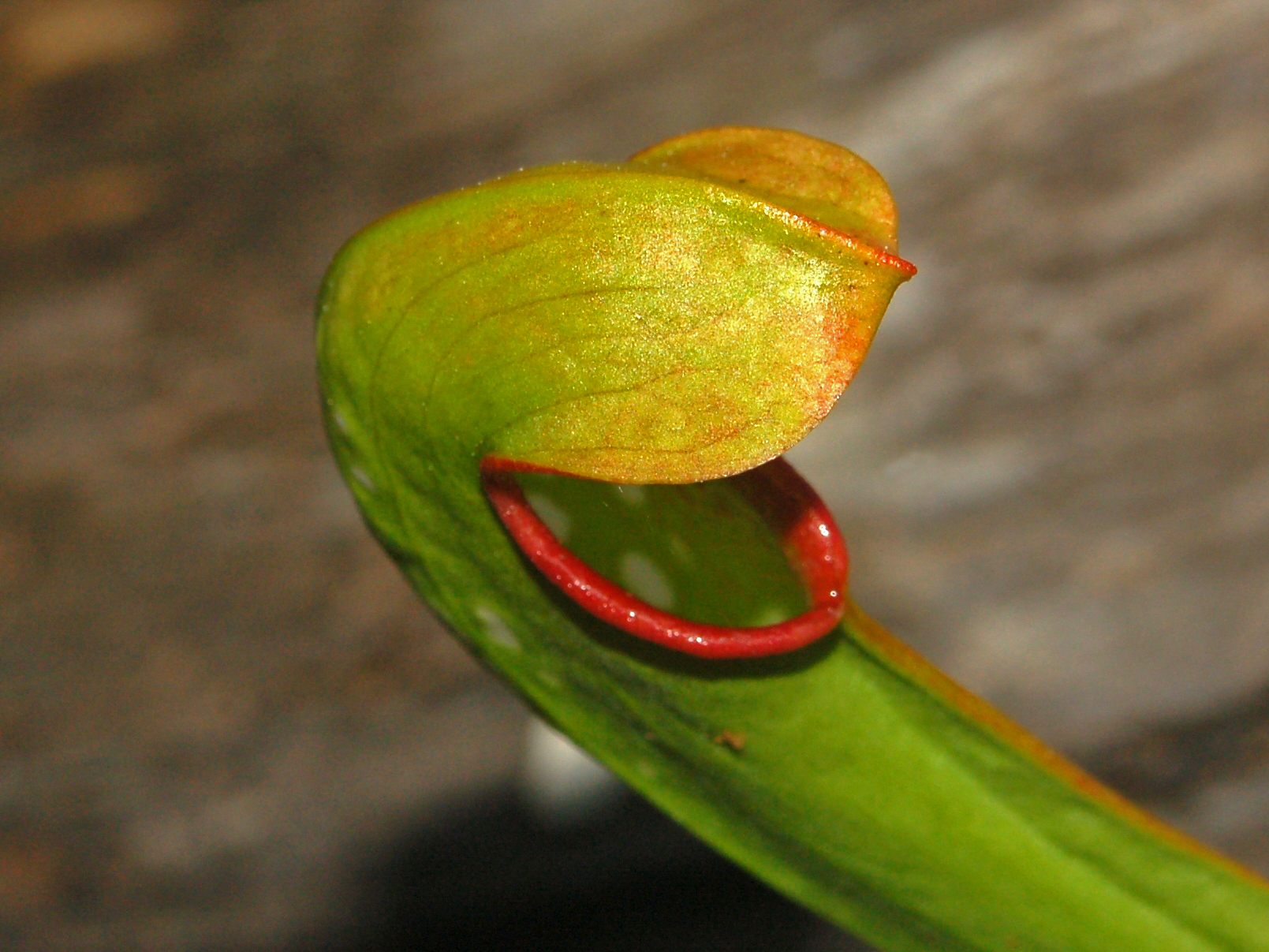
Close-up on Sarracenia minor pitcher
